

168001–168100 

|-bgcolor=#d6d6d6
| 168001 ||  || — || April 10, 2005 || Kitt Peak || Spacewatch || KOR || align=right | 2.4 km || 
|-id=002 bgcolor=#d6d6d6
| 168002 ||  || — || April 10, 2005 || Kitt Peak || Spacewatch || — || align=right | 5.0 km || 
|-id=003 bgcolor=#d6d6d6
| 168003 ||  || — || April 11, 2005 || Mount Lemmon || Mount Lemmon Survey || — || align=right | 4.0 km || 
|-id=004 bgcolor=#d6d6d6
| 168004 ||  || — || April 12, 2005 || Kitt Peak || Spacewatch || KOR || align=right | 2.1 km || 
|-id=005 bgcolor=#E9E9E9
| 168005 ||  || — || April 13, 2005 || Catalina || CSS || — || align=right | 2.9 km || 
|-id=006 bgcolor=#d6d6d6
| 168006 ||  || — || April 12, 2005 || Anderson Mesa || LONEOS || — || align=right | 6.8 km || 
|-id=007 bgcolor=#d6d6d6
| 168007 ||  || — || April 12, 2005 || Kitt Peak || Spacewatch || KAR || align=right | 2.1 km || 
|-id=008 bgcolor=#E9E9E9
| 168008 ||  || — || April 12, 2005 || Kitt Peak || Spacewatch || — || align=right | 2.5 km || 
|-id=009 bgcolor=#E9E9E9
| 168009 ||  || — || April 9, 2005 || Mount Lemmon || Mount Lemmon Survey || — || align=right | 1.2 km || 
|-id=010 bgcolor=#E9E9E9
| 168010 || 2005 HP || — || April 16, 2005 || Kitt Peak || Spacewatch || — || align=right | 2.0 km || 
|-id=011 bgcolor=#d6d6d6
| 168011 ||  || — || April 16, 2005 || Kitt Peak || Spacewatch || KOR || align=right | 2.0 km || 
|-id=012 bgcolor=#d6d6d6
| 168012 ||  || — || April 16, 2005 || Kitt Peak || Spacewatch || — || align=right | 4.0 km || 
|-id=013 bgcolor=#d6d6d6
| 168013 ||  || — || April 30, 2005 || Reedy Creek || J. Broughton || — || align=right | 3.6 km || 
|-id=014 bgcolor=#d6d6d6
| 168014 ||  || — || April 30, 2005 || Kitt Peak || Spacewatch || — || align=right | 4.3 km || 
|-id=015 bgcolor=#d6d6d6
| 168015 ||  || — || April 30, 2005 || Campo Imperatore || CINEOS || HYG || align=right | 6.1 km || 
|-id=016 bgcolor=#d6d6d6
| 168016 ||  || — || April 30, 2005 || Campo Imperatore || CINEOS || — || align=right | 4.7 km || 
|-id=017 bgcolor=#E9E9E9
| 168017 ||  || — || May 3, 2005 || Kitt Peak || Spacewatch || — || align=right | 2.2 km || 
|-id=018 bgcolor=#E9E9E9
| 168018 ||  || — || May 4, 2005 || Mauna Kea || C. Veillet || — || align=right | 3.0 km || 
|-id=019 bgcolor=#d6d6d6
| 168019 ||  || — || May 4, 2005 || Mauna Kea || C. Veillet || — || align=right | 3.6 km || 
|-id=020 bgcolor=#d6d6d6
| 168020 ||  || — || May 4, 2005 || Siding Spring || SSS || — || align=right | 3.7 km || 
|-id=021 bgcolor=#d6d6d6
| 168021 ||  || — || May 3, 2005 || Kitt Peak || Spacewatch || — || align=right | 3.2 km || 
|-id=022 bgcolor=#d6d6d6
| 168022 ||  || — || May 8, 2005 || Anderson Mesa || LONEOS || LUT || align=right | 5.9 km || 
|-id=023 bgcolor=#d6d6d6
| 168023 ||  || — || May 3, 2005 || Kitt Peak || Spacewatch || — || align=right | 4.3 km || 
|-id=024 bgcolor=#E9E9E9
| 168024 ||  || — || May 9, 2005 || Siding Spring || SSS || HNS || align=right | 2.3 km || 
|-id=025 bgcolor=#d6d6d6
| 168025 ||  || — || May 8, 2005 || Mount Lemmon || Mount Lemmon Survey || — || align=right | 3.9 km || 
|-id=026 bgcolor=#E9E9E9
| 168026 ||  || — || May 11, 2005 || Kitt Peak || Spacewatch || — || align=right | 1.8 km || 
|-id=027 bgcolor=#d6d6d6
| 168027 ||  || — || May 11, 2005 || Palomar || NEAT || URS || align=right | 7.7 km || 
|-id=028 bgcolor=#d6d6d6
| 168028 ||  || — || May 7, 2005 || Kitt Peak || Spacewatch || EOS || align=right | 4.3 km || 
|-id=029 bgcolor=#d6d6d6
| 168029 ||  || — || May 8, 2005 || Kitt Peak || Spacewatch || EOS || align=right | 3.3 km || 
|-id=030 bgcolor=#d6d6d6
| 168030 ||  || — || May 9, 2005 || Anderson Mesa || LONEOS || — || align=right | 6.0 km || 
|-id=031 bgcolor=#d6d6d6
| 168031 ||  || — || May 9, 2005 || Kitt Peak || Spacewatch || — || align=right | 6.4 km || 
|-id=032 bgcolor=#E9E9E9
| 168032 ||  || — || May 11, 2005 || Mount Lemmon || Mount Lemmon Survey || KON || align=right | 3.9 km || 
|-id=033 bgcolor=#C2FFFF
| 168033 ||  || — || May 15, 2005 || Mount Lemmon || Mount Lemmon Survey || L4 || align=right | 14 km || 
|-id=034 bgcolor=#E9E9E9
| 168034 ||  || — || May 4, 2005 || Kitt Peak || Spacewatch || — || align=right | 3.0 km || 
|-id=035 bgcolor=#d6d6d6
| 168035 ||  || — || May 4, 2005 || Palomar || NEAT || — || align=right | 3.1 km || 
|-id=036 bgcolor=#d6d6d6
| 168036 ||  || — || May 4, 2005 || Catalina || CSS || — || align=right | 5.9 km || 
|-id=037 bgcolor=#d6d6d6
| 168037 ||  || — || May 4, 2005 || Palomar || NEAT || — || align=right | 6.2 km || 
|-id=038 bgcolor=#d6d6d6
| 168038 ||  || — || May 10, 2005 || Mount Lemmon || Mount Lemmon Survey || KOR || align=right | 2.2 km || 
|-id=039 bgcolor=#d6d6d6
| 168039 ||  || — || June 1, 2005 || Mount Lemmon || Mount Lemmon Survey || 7:4 || align=right | 7.1 km || 
|-id=040 bgcolor=#d6d6d6
| 168040 ||  || — || June 14, 2005 || Kitt Peak || Spacewatch || EMA || align=right | 6.4 km || 
|-id=041 bgcolor=#d6d6d6
| 168041 ||  || — || June 28, 2005 || Kitt Peak || Spacewatch || VER || align=right | 4.6 km || 
|-id=042 bgcolor=#d6d6d6
| 168042 ||  || — || June 24, 2005 || Palomar || NEAT || — || align=right | 2.6 km || 
|-id=043 bgcolor=#d6d6d6
| 168043 ||  || — || July 5, 2005 || Palomar || NEAT || URS || align=right | 6.2 km || 
|-id=044 bgcolor=#FFC2E0
| 168044 || 2005 SG || — || September 21, 2005 || Siding Spring || SSS || ATEcritical || align=right data-sort-value="0.56" | 560 m || 
|-id=045 bgcolor=#fefefe
| 168045 ||  || — || December 30, 2005 || Catalina || CSS || H || align=right | 1.7 km || 
|-id=046 bgcolor=#fefefe
| 168046 ||  || — || January 2, 2006 || Catalina || CSS || H || align=right | 1.0 km || 
|-id=047 bgcolor=#fefefe
| 168047 ||  || — || January 22, 2006 || Socorro || LINEAR || H || align=right data-sort-value="0.72" | 720 m || 
|-id=048 bgcolor=#fefefe
| 168048 ||  || — || January 21, 2006 || Kitt Peak || Spacewatch || — || align=right | 1.1 km || 
|-id=049 bgcolor=#fefefe
| 168049 ||  || — || January 22, 2006 || Anderson Mesa || LONEOS || H || align=right data-sort-value="0.92" | 920 m || 
|-id=050 bgcolor=#fefefe
| 168050 ||  || — || January 26, 2006 || Kitt Peak || Spacewatch || FLO || align=right data-sort-value="0.94" | 940 m || 
|-id=051 bgcolor=#fefefe
| 168051 ||  || — || January 23, 2006 || Kitt Peak || Spacewatch || — || align=right data-sort-value="0.79" | 790 m || 
|-id=052 bgcolor=#fefefe
| 168052 ||  || — || January 26, 2006 || Kitt Peak || Spacewatch || MAS || align=right | 1.1 km || 
|-id=053 bgcolor=#fefefe
| 168053 ||  || — || January 26, 2006 || Kitt Peak || Spacewatch || — || align=right data-sort-value="0.96" | 960 m || 
|-id=054 bgcolor=#fefefe
| 168054 ||  || — || January 23, 2006 || Mount Lemmon || Mount Lemmon Survey || NYS || align=right | 1.0 km || 
|-id=055 bgcolor=#fefefe
| 168055 ||  || — || January 26, 2006 || Kitt Peak || Spacewatch || — || align=right | 1.1 km || 
|-id=056 bgcolor=#fefefe
| 168056 ||  || — || January 25, 2006 || Kitt Peak || Spacewatch || — || align=right | 1.2 km || 
|-id=057 bgcolor=#fefefe
| 168057 ||  || — || January 26, 2006 || Mount Lemmon || Mount Lemmon Survey || MAS || align=right | 1.2 km || 
|-id=058 bgcolor=#fefefe
| 168058 ||  || — || January 30, 2006 || Kitt Peak || Spacewatch || NYS || align=right | 1.8 km || 
|-id=059 bgcolor=#fefefe
| 168059 ||  || — || January 31, 2006 || Kitt Peak || Spacewatch || FLO || align=right data-sort-value="0.68" | 680 m || 
|-id=060 bgcolor=#fefefe
| 168060 ||  || — || January 31, 2006 || Kitt Peak || Spacewatch || — || align=right data-sort-value="0.82" | 820 m || 
|-id=061 bgcolor=#fefefe
| 168061 ||  || — || January 31, 2006 || Kitt Peak || Spacewatch || — || align=right | 1.3 km || 
|-id=062 bgcolor=#E9E9E9
| 168062 ||  || — || January 31, 2006 || Kitt Peak || Spacewatch || — || align=right | 2.4 km || 
|-id=063 bgcolor=#d6d6d6
| 168063 ||  || — || January 31, 2006 || Kitt Peak || Spacewatch || HYG || align=right | 4.3 km || 
|-id=064 bgcolor=#E9E9E9
| 168064 ||  || — || January 31, 2006 || Kitt Peak || Spacewatch || — || align=right | 2.1 km || 
|-id=065 bgcolor=#fefefe
| 168065 ||  || — || January 31, 2006 || Kitt Peak || Spacewatch || — || align=right | 1.2 km || 
|-id=066 bgcolor=#E9E9E9
| 168066 ||  || — || January 28, 2006 || Anderson Mesa || LONEOS || — || align=right | 5.0 km || 
|-id=067 bgcolor=#E9E9E9
| 168067 ||  || — || February 1, 2006 || Mount Lemmon || Mount Lemmon Survey || — || align=right | 1.3 km || 
|-id=068 bgcolor=#fefefe
| 168068 ||  || — || February 1, 2006 || Kitt Peak || Spacewatch || FLO || align=right | 1.8 km || 
|-id=069 bgcolor=#fefefe
| 168069 ||  || — || February 2, 2006 || Kitt Peak || Spacewatch || NYS || align=right | 1.2 km || 
|-id=070 bgcolor=#fefefe
| 168070 ||  || — || February 2, 2006 || Kitt Peak || Spacewatch || FLO || align=right data-sort-value="0.89" | 890 m || 
|-id=071 bgcolor=#E9E9E9
| 168071 ||  || — || February 2, 2006 || Kitt Peak || Spacewatch || — || align=right | 2.1 km || 
|-id=072 bgcolor=#fefefe
| 168072 ||  || — || February 20, 2006 || Kitt Peak || Spacewatch || NYS || align=right | 1.0 km || 
|-id=073 bgcolor=#fefefe
| 168073 ||  || — || February 20, 2006 || Kitt Peak || Spacewatch || — || align=right | 1.1 km || 
|-id=074 bgcolor=#fefefe
| 168074 ||  || — || February 20, 2006 || Kitt Peak || Spacewatch || — || align=right | 1.4 km || 
|-id=075 bgcolor=#fefefe
| 168075 ||  || — || February 20, 2006 || Kitt Peak || Spacewatch || FLO || align=right data-sort-value="0.97" | 970 m || 
|-id=076 bgcolor=#fefefe
| 168076 ||  || — || February 20, 2006 || Kitt Peak || Spacewatch || — || align=right data-sort-value="0.83" | 830 m || 
|-id=077 bgcolor=#fefefe
| 168077 ||  || — || February 20, 2006 || Kitt Peak || Spacewatch || NYS || align=right | 1.5 km || 
|-id=078 bgcolor=#E9E9E9
| 168078 ||  || — || February 20, 2006 || Kitt Peak || Spacewatch || — || align=right | 2.6 km || 
|-id=079 bgcolor=#fefefe
| 168079 ||  || — || February 20, 2006 || Kitt Peak || Spacewatch || MAS || align=right data-sort-value="0.97" | 970 m || 
|-id=080 bgcolor=#fefefe
| 168080 ||  || — || February 24, 2006 || Kitt Peak || Spacewatch || — || align=right | 1.0 km || 
|-id=081 bgcolor=#fefefe
| 168081 ||  || — || February 24, 2006 || Mount Lemmon || Mount Lemmon Survey || — || align=right | 1.1 km || 
|-id=082 bgcolor=#fefefe
| 168082 ||  || — || February 24, 2006 || Kitt Peak || Spacewatch || MAS || align=right data-sort-value="0.84" | 840 m || 
|-id=083 bgcolor=#E9E9E9
| 168083 ||  || — || February 22, 2006 || Catalina || CSS || — || align=right | 4.1 km || 
|-id=084 bgcolor=#fefefe
| 168084 ||  || — || February 24, 2006 || Catalina || CSS || H || align=right | 1.1 km || 
|-id=085 bgcolor=#E9E9E9
| 168085 ||  || — || February 20, 2006 || Mount Lemmon || Mount Lemmon Survey || — || align=right | 2.9 km || 
|-id=086 bgcolor=#fefefe
| 168086 ||  || — || February 20, 2006 || Mount Lemmon || Mount Lemmon Survey || V || align=right data-sort-value="0.78" | 780 m || 
|-id=087 bgcolor=#fefefe
| 168087 ||  || — || February 24, 2006 || Kitt Peak || Spacewatch || — || align=right | 1.1 km || 
|-id=088 bgcolor=#fefefe
| 168088 ||  || — || February 24, 2006 || Kitt Peak || Spacewatch || — || align=right | 3.7 km || 
|-id=089 bgcolor=#fefefe
| 168089 ||  || — || February 24, 2006 || Kitt Peak || Spacewatch || fast? || align=right | 1.0 km || 
|-id=090 bgcolor=#E9E9E9
| 168090 ||  || — || February 24, 2006 || Kitt Peak || Spacewatch || RAF || align=right | 1.1 km || 
|-id=091 bgcolor=#E9E9E9
| 168091 ||  || — || February 24, 2006 || Kitt Peak || Spacewatch || — || align=right | 1.8 km || 
|-id=092 bgcolor=#fefefe
| 168092 ||  || — || February 25, 2006 || Mount Lemmon || Mount Lemmon Survey || — || align=right | 1.1 km || 
|-id=093 bgcolor=#E9E9E9
| 168093 ||  || — || February 25, 2006 || Mount Lemmon || Mount Lemmon Survey || — || align=right | 1.6 km || 
|-id=094 bgcolor=#fefefe
| 168094 ||  || — || February 27, 2006 || Kitt Peak || Spacewatch || — || align=right | 1.3 km || 
|-id=095 bgcolor=#fefefe
| 168095 ||  || — || February 24, 2006 || Kitt Peak || Spacewatch || FLO || align=right | 1.0 km || 
|-id=096 bgcolor=#fefefe
| 168096 ||  || — || February 25, 2006 || Kitt Peak || Spacewatch || — || align=right | 1.3 km || 
|-id=097 bgcolor=#fefefe
| 168097 ||  || — || February 27, 2006 || Kitt Peak || Spacewatch || — || align=right | 1.5 km || 
|-id=098 bgcolor=#fefefe
| 168098 ||  || — || February 23, 2006 || Anderson Mesa || LONEOS || — || align=right | 1.1 km || 
|-id=099 bgcolor=#E9E9E9
| 168099 ||  || — || February 25, 2006 || Kitt Peak || Spacewatch || — || align=right | 3.0 km || 
|-id=100 bgcolor=#E9E9E9
| 168100 ||  || — || February 20, 2006 || Kitt Peak || Spacewatch || — || align=right | 1.5 km || 
|}

168101–168200 

|-bgcolor=#fefefe
| 168101 ||  || — || February 20, 2006 || Kitt Peak || Spacewatch || NYS || align=right data-sort-value="0.83" | 830 m || 
|-id=102 bgcolor=#fefefe
| 168102 ||  || — || February 25, 2006 || Kitt Peak || Spacewatch || — || align=right | 1.3 km || 
|-id=103 bgcolor=#fefefe
| 168103 ||  || — || February 27, 2006 || Catalina || CSS || H || align=right | 1.1 km || 
|-id=104 bgcolor=#fefefe
| 168104 ||  || — || March 2, 2006 || Kitt Peak || Spacewatch || NYS || align=right | 1.5 km || 
|-id=105 bgcolor=#fefefe
| 168105 ||  || — || March 2, 2006 || Kitt Peak || Spacewatch || — || align=right | 1.6 km || 
|-id=106 bgcolor=#fefefe
| 168106 ||  || — || March 4, 2006 || Kitt Peak || Spacewatch || — || align=right | 1.0 km || 
|-id=107 bgcolor=#E9E9E9
| 168107 ||  || — || March 4, 2006 || Catalina || CSS || — || align=right | 2.1 km || 
|-id=108 bgcolor=#E9E9E9
| 168108 ||  || — || March 4, 2006 || Kitt Peak || Spacewatch || — || align=right | 1.4 km || 
|-id=109 bgcolor=#fefefe
| 168109 ||  || — || March 2, 2006 || Mount Lemmon || Mount Lemmon Survey || — || align=right | 1.5 km || 
|-id=110 bgcolor=#fefefe
| 168110 ||  || — || March 5, 2006 || Kitt Peak || Spacewatch || — || align=right | 1.6 km || 
|-id=111 bgcolor=#fefefe
| 168111 ||  || — || March 5, 2006 || Kitt Peak || Spacewatch || NYS || align=right | 1.9 km || 
|-id=112 bgcolor=#E9E9E9
| 168112 || 2006 FG || — || March 19, 2006 || Socorro || LINEAR || — || align=right | 4.6 km || 
|-id=113 bgcolor=#d6d6d6
| 168113 ||  || — || March 23, 2006 || Kitt Peak || Spacewatch || TIR || align=right | 4.8 km || 
|-id=114 bgcolor=#fefefe
| 168114 ||  || — || March 23, 2006 || Mount Lemmon || Mount Lemmon Survey || NYS || align=right | 1.2 km || 
|-id=115 bgcolor=#E9E9E9
| 168115 ||  || — || March 24, 2006 || RAS || A. Lowe || — || align=right | 3.7 km || 
|-id=116 bgcolor=#fefefe
| 168116 ||  || — || March 23, 2006 || Kitt Peak || Spacewatch || V || align=right | 1.0 km || 
|-id=117 bgcolor=#E9E9E9
| 168117 ||  || — || March 23, 2006 || Kitt Peak || Spacewatch || — || align=right | 1.2 km || 
|-id=118 bgcolor=#fefefe
| 168118 ||  || — || March 24, 2006 || Kitt Peak || Spacewatch || MAS || align=right | 1.3 km || 
|-id=119 bgcolor=#fefefe
| 168119 ||  || — || March 24, 2006 || Mount Lemmon || Mount Lemmon Survey || — || align=right | 1.3 km || 
|-id=120 bgcolor=#E9E9E9
| 168120 ||  || — || March 25, 2006 || Kitt Peak || Spacewatch || — || align=right data-sort-value="0.96" | 960 m || 
|-id=121 bgcolor=#E9E9E9
| 168121 ||  || — || March 25, 2006 || Kitt Peak || Spacewatch || — || align=right | 2.8 km || 
|-id=122 bgcolor=#fefefe
| 168122 ||  || — || March 25, 2006 || Palomar || NEAT || — || align=right | 1.3 km || 
|-id=123 bgcolor=#fefefe
| 168123 ||  || — || March 24, 2006 || Siding Spring || SSS || — || align=right | 1.6 km || 
|-id=124 bgcolor=#fefefe
| 168124 ||  || — || March 23, 2006 || Mount Lemmon || Mount Lemmon Survey || — || align=right data-sort-value="0.97" | 970 m || 
|-id=125 bgcolor=#fefefe
| 168125 ||  || — || March 24, 2006 || Anderson Mesa || LONEOS || NYS || align=right data-sort-value="0.94" | 940 m || 
|-id=126 bgcolor=#E9E9E9
| 168126 Chengbruce || 2006 GK ||  || April 1, 2006 || Lulin Observatory || Q.-z. Ye, T.-C. Yang || — || align=right | 1.8 km || 
|-id=127 bgcolor=#fefefe
| 168127 ||  || — || April 6, 2006 || Ottmarsheim || C. Rinner || — || align=right | 1.2 km || 
|-id=128 bgcolor=#fefefe
| 168128 ||  || — || April 2, 2006 || Kitt Peak || Spacewatch || — || align=right | 3.1 km || 
|-id=129 bgcolor=#fefefe
| 168129 ||  || — || April 2, 2006 || Kitt Peak || Spacewatch || FLO || align=right data-sort-value="0.90" | 900 m || 
|-id=130 bgcolor=#fefefe
| 168130 ||  || — || April 2, 2006 || Kitt Peak || Spacewatch || — || align=right | 1.2 km || 
|-id=131 bgcolor=#E9E9E9
| 168131 ||  || — || April 6, 2006 || Catalina || CSS || JUN || align=right | 1.5 km || 
|-id=132 bgcolor=#E9E9E9
| 168132 ||  || — || April 6, 2006 || Siding Spring || SSS || MIT || align=right | 5.4 km || 
|-id=133 bgcolor=#fefefe
| 168133 ||  || — || April 8, 2006 || Mount Lemmon || Mount Lemmon Survey || — || align=right | 2.7 km || 
|-id=134 bgcolor=#fefefe
| 168134 ||  || — || April 9, 2006 || Kitt Peak || Spacewatch || — || align=right | 1.7 km || 
|-id=135 bgcolor=#E9E9E9
| 168135 ||  || — || April 6, 2006 || Siding Spring || SSS || — || align=right | 3.7 km || 
|-id=136 bgcolor=#fefefe
| 168136 ||  || — || April 7, 2006 || Catalina || CSS || — || align=right | 1.1 km || 
|-id=137 bgcolor=#E9E9E9
| 168137 ||  || — || April 9, 2006 || Socorro || LINEAR || — || align=right | 2.0 km || 
|-id=138 bgcolor=#E9E9E9
| 168138 ||  || — || April 7, 2006 || Catalina || CSS || ADE || align=right | 2.4 km || 
|-id=139 bgcolor=#d6d6d6
| 168139 ||  || — || April 7, 2006 || Siding Spring || SSS || — || align=right | 6.2 km || 
|-id=140 bgcolor=#fefefe
| 168140 ||  || — || April 8, 2006 || Siding Spring || SSS || FLO || align=right | 1.8 km || 
|-id=141 bgcolor=#fefefe
| 168141 || 2006 HL || — || April 18, 2006 || Kitt Peak || Spacewatch || V || align=right | 1.1 km || 
|-id=142 bgcolor=#fefefe
| 168142 ||  || — || April 18, 2006 || Kitt Peak || Spacewatch || — || align=right | 2.6 km || 
|-id=143 bgcolor=#fefefe
| 168143 ||  || — || April 18, 2006 || Kitt Peak || Spacewatch || FLO || align=right data-sort-value="0.98" | 980 m || 
|-id=144 bgcolor=#fefefe
| 168144 ||  || — || April 19, 2006 || Kitt Peak || Spacewatch || — || align=right | 1.2 km || 
|-id=145 bgcolor=#E9E9E9
| 168145 ||  || — || April 20, 2006 || Kitt Peak || Spacewatch || — || align=right | 1.0 km || 
|-id=146 bgcolor=#E9E9E9
| 168146 ||  || — || April 20, 2006 || Kitt Peak || Spacewatch || — || align=right | 1.5 km || 
|-id=147 bgcolor=#E9E9E9
| 168147 ||  || — || April 20, 2006 || Kitt Peak || Spacewatch || — || align=right | 2.5 km || 
|-id=148 bgcolor=#E9E9E9
| 168148 ||  || — || April 25, 2006 || RAS || A. Lowe || GEF || align=right | 1.8 km || 
|-id=149 bgcolor=#fefefe
| 168149 ||  || — || April 18, 2006 || Anderson Mesa || LONEOS || V || align=right | 1.1 km || 
|-id=150 bgcolor=#fefefe
| 168150 ||  || — || April 19, 2006 || Palomar || NEAT || — || align=right | 1.4 km || 
|-id=151 bgcolor=#d6d6d6
| 168151 ||  || — || April 19, 2006 || Mount Lemmon || Mount Lemmon Survey || — || align=right | 4.2 km || 
|-id=152 bgcolor=#fefefe
| 168152 ||  || — || April 21, 2006 || Catalina || CSS || FLO || align=right | 1.1 km || 
|-id=153 bgcolor=#fefefe
| 168153 ||  || — || April 23, 2006 || Kitt Peak || Spacewatch || NYS || align=right | 1.0 km || 
|-id=154 bgcolor=#d6d6d6
| 168154 ||  || — || April 23, 2006 || Socorro || LINEAR || EUP || align=right | 7.5 km || 
|-id=155 bgcolor=#E9E9E9
| 168155 ||  || — || April 20, 2006 || Kitt Peak || Spacewatch || — || align=right | 1.9 km || 
|-id=156 bgcolor=#E9E9E9
| 168156 ||  || — || April 20, 2006 || Kitt Peak || Spacewatch || — || align=right | 1.4 km || 
|-id=157 bgcolor=#d6d6d6
| 168157 ||  || — || April 20, 2006 || Catalina || CSS || — || align=right | 4.2 km || 
|-id=158 bgcolor=#E9E9E9
| 168158 ||  || — || April 25, 2006 || Socorro || LINEAR || EUN || align=right | 2.2 km || 
|-id=159 bgcolor=#E9E9E9
| 168159 ||  || — || April 18, 2006 || Anderson Mesa || LONEOS || — || align=right | 1.6 km || 
|-id=160 bgcolor=#E9E9E9
| 168160 ||  || — || April 21, 2006 || Socorro || LINEAR || — || align=right | 2.4 km || 
|-id=161 bgcolor=#fefefe
| 168161 ||  || — || April 24, 2006 || Socorro || LINEAR || V || align=right data-sort-value="0.99" | 990 m || 
|-id=162 bgcolor=#E9E9E9
| 168162 ||  || — || April 24, 2006 || Anderson Mesa || LONEOS || — || align=right | 2.4 km || 
|-id=163 bgcolor=#E9E9E9
| 168163 ||  || — || April 24, 2006 || Anderson Mesa || LONEOS || MAR || align=right | 1.7 km || 
|-id=164 bgcolor=#E9E9E9
| 168164 ||  || — || April 27, 2006 || Bergisch Gladbach || W. Bickel || EUN || align=right | 1.7 km || 
|-id=165 bgcolor=#E9E9E9
| 168165 ||  || — || April 28, 2006 || Socorro || LINEAR || GER || align=right | 2.8 km || 
|-id=166 bgcolor=#E9E9E9
| 168166 ||  || — || April 24, 2006 || Kitt Peak || Spacewatch || HEN || align=right | 1.5 km || 
|-id=167 bgcolor=#E9E9E9
| 168167 ||  || — || April 24, 2006 || Kitt Peak || Spacewatch || — || align=right | 3.0 km || 
|-id=168 bgcolor=#E9E9E9
| 168168 ||  || — || April 24, 2006 || Mount Lemmon || Mount Lemmon Survey || MRX || align=right | 1.6 km || 
|-id=169 bgcolor=#E9E9E9
| 168169 ||  || — || April 24, 2006 || Kitt Peak || Spacewatch || ADE || align=right | 3.8 km || 
|-id=170 bgcolor=#E9E9E9
| 168170 ||  || — || April 25, 2006 || Palomar || NEAT || — || align=right | 2.0 km || 
|-id=171 bgcolor=#E9E9E9
| 168171 ||  || — || April 25, 2006 || Kitt Peak || Spacewatch || EUN || align=right | 2.1 km || 
|-id=172 bgcolor=#E9E9E9
| 168172 ||  || — || April 26, 2006 || Kitt Peak || Spacewatch || — || align=right | 1.6 km || 
|-id=173 bgcolor=#fefefe
| 168173 ||  || — || April 26, 2006 || Kitt Peak || Spacewatch || V || align=right | 1.3 km || 
|-id=174 bgcolor=#fefefe
| 168174 ||  || — || April 26, 2006 || Kitt Peak || Spacewatch || NYS || align=right | 1.1 km || 
|-id=175 bgcolor=#E9E9E9
| 168175 ||  || — || April 26, 2006 || Kitt Peak || Spacewatch || — || align=right | 3.3 km || 
|-id=176 bgcolor=#d6d6d6
| 168176 ||  || — || April 26, 2006 || Kitt Peak || Spacewatch || — || align=right | 4.5 km || 
|-id=177 bgcolor=#fefefe
| 168177 ||  || — || April 26, 2006 || Kitt Peak || Spacewatch || — || align=right | 1.3 km || 
|-id=178 bgcolor=#E9E9E9
| 168178 ||  || — || April 26, 2006 || Kitt Peak || Spacewatch || — || align=right | 3.2 km || 
|-id=179 bgcolor=#fefefe
| 168179 ||  || — || April 27, 2006 || Kitt Peak || Spacewatch || — || align=right data-sort-value="0.95" | 950 m || 
|-id=180 bgcolor=#E9E9E9
| 168180 ||  || — || April 30, 2006 || Kitt Peak || Spacewatch || — || align=right | 2.0 km || 
|-id=181 bgcolor=#fefefe
| 168181 ||  || — || April 26, 2006 || Kitt Peak || Spacewatch || — || align=right | 1.1 km || 
|-id=182 bgcolor=#E9E9E9
| 168182 ||  || — || April 26, 2006 || Anderson Mesa || LONEOS || MAR || align=right | 1.8 km || 
|-id=183 bgcolor=#E9E9E9
| 168183 ||  || — || April 30, 2006 || Kitt Peak || Spacewatch || — || align=right | 3.8 km || 
|-id=184 bgcolor=#E9E9E9
| 168184 ||  || — || April 30, 2006 || Kitt Peak || Spacewatch || — || align=right | 1.8 km || 
|-id=185 bgcolor=#E9E9E9
| 168185 ||  || — || April 30, 2006 || Kitt Peak || Spacewatch || — || align=right | 2.7 km || 
|-id=186 bgcolor=#E9E9E9
| 168186 ||  || — || April 30, 2006 || Catalina || CSS || — || align=right | 2.9 km || 
|-id=187 bgcolor=#fefefe
| 168187 ||  || — || April 25, 2006 || Mount Lemmon || Mount Lemmon Survey || — || align=right | 1.3 km || 
|-id=188 bgcolor=#E9E9E9
| 168188 ||  || — || April 26, 2006 || Kitt Peak || Spacewatch || — || align=right | 1.2 km || 
|-id=189 bgcolor=#E9E9E9
| 168189 ||  || — || April 26, 2006 || Mount Lemmon || Mount Lemmon Survey || EUN || align=right | 2.1 km || 
|-id=190 bgcolor=#E9E9E9
| 168190 ||  || — || April 30, 2006 || Kitt Peak || Spacewatch || WIT || align=right | 1.1 km || 
|-id=191 bgcolor=#E9E9E9
| 168191 ||  || — || April 30, 2006 || Catalina || CSS || — || align=right | 1.9 km || 
|-id=192 bgcolor=#E9E9E9
| 168192 || 2006 JZ || — || May 3, 2006 || Reedy Creek || J. Broughton || — || align=right | 3.5 km || 
|-id=193 bgcolor=#d6d6d6
| 168193 ||  || — || May 1, 2006 || Kitt Peak || Spacewatch || — || align=right | 3.7 km || 
|-id=194 bgcolor=#fefefe
| 168194 ||  || — || May 1, 2006 || Socorro || LINEAR || — || align=right | 1.5 km || 
|-id=195 bgcolor=#fefefe
| 168195 ||  || — || May 1, 2006 || Socorro || LINEAR || — || align=right | 1.0 km || 
|-id=196 bgcolor=#fefefe
| 168196 ||  || — || May 3, 2006 || Mount Lemmon || Mount Lemmon Survey || V || align=right data-sort-value="0.94" | 940 m || 
|-id=197 bgcolor=#fefefe
| 168197 ||  || — || May 1, 2006 || Kitt Peak || Spacewatch || — || align=right | 1.3 km || 
|-id=198 bgcolor=#E9E9E9
| 168198 ||  || — || May 2, 2006 || Mount Lemmon || Mount Lemmon Survey || — || align=right | 3.0 km || 
|-id=199 bgcolor=#E9E9E9
| 168199 ||  || — || May 2, 2006 || Mount Lemmon || Mount Lemmon Survey || — || align=right | 2.7 km || 
|-id=200 bgcolor=#E9E9E9
| 168200 ||  || — || May 2, 2006 || Kitt Peak || Spacewatch || — || align=right | 3.5 km || 
|}

168201–168300 

|-bgcolor=#E9E9E9
| 168201 ||  || — || May 3, 2006 || Mount Lemmon || Mount Lemmon Survey || — || align=right | 2.7 km || 
|-id=202 bgcolor=#E9E9E9
| 168202 ||  || — || May 5, 2006 || Reedy Creek || J. Broughton || — || align=right | 1.7 km || 
|-id=203 bgcolor=#fefefe
| 168203 Kereszturi||  || — || May 5, 2006 || Piszkéstető || K. Sárneczky || NYS || align=right data-sort-value="0.69" | 690 m || 
|-id=204 bgcolor=#fefefe
| 168204 ||  || — || May 1, 2006 || Socorro || LINEAR || FLO || align=right | 1.1 km || 
|-id=205 bgcolor=#E9E9E9
| 168205 ||  || — || May 3, 2006 || Kitt Peak || Spacewatch || — || align=right | 3.5 km || 
|-id=206 bgcolor=#E9E9E9
| 168206 ||  || — || May 3, 2006 || Kitt Peak || Spacewatch || — || align=right | 2.9 km || 
|-id=207 bgcolor=#E9E9E9
| 168207 ||  || — || May 3, 2006 || Kitt Peak || Spacewatch || — || align=right | 3.1 km || 
|-id=208 bgcolor=#fefefe
| 168208 ||  || — || May 3, 2006 || Kitt Peak || Spacewatch || V || align=right data-sort-value="0.87" | 870 m || 
|-id=209 bgcolor=#fefefe
| 168209 ||  || — || May 3, 2006 || Kitt Peak || Spacewatch || — || align=right | 1.1 km || 
|-id=210 bgcolor=#fefefe
| 168210 ||  || — || May 5, 2006 || Anderson Mesa || LONEOS || — || align=right | 1.1 km || 
|-id=211 bgcolor=#E9E9E9
| 168211 ||  || — || May 6, 2006 || Mount Lemmon || Mount Lemmon Survey || — || align=right | 4.7 km || 
|-id=212 bgcolor=#E9E9E9
| 168212 ||  || — || May 5, 2006 || Kitt Peak || Spacewatch || — || align=right | 3.1 km || 
|-id=213 bgcolor=#d6d6d6
| 168213 ||  || — || May 7, 2006 || Mount Lemmon || Mount Lemmon Survey || — || align=right | 4.9 km || 
|-id=214 bgcolor=#E9E9E9
| 168214 ||  || — || May 7, 2006 || Kitt Peak || Spacewatch || — || align=right | 4.2 km || 
|-id=215 bgcolor=#E9E9E9
| 168215 ||  || — || May 10, 2006 || Palomar || NEAT || — || align=right | 2.2 km || 
|-id=216 bgcolor=#E9E9E9
| 168216 ||  || — || May 8, 2006 || Siding Spring || SSS || — || align=right | 2.8 km || 
|-id=217 bgcolor=#fefefe
| 168217 ||  || — || May 6, 2006 || Mount Lemmon || Mount Lemmon Survey || V || align=right | 1.1 km || 
|-id=218 bgcolor=#E9E9E9
| 168218 ||  || — || May 8, 2006 || Mount Lemmon || Mount Lemmon Survey || MIT || align=right | 3.0 km || 
|-id=219 bgcolor=#E9E9E9
| 168219 ||  || — || May 9, 2006 || Mount Lemmon || Mount Lemmon Survey || — || align=right | 4.8 km || 
|-id=220 bgcolor=#d6d6d6
| 168220 ||  || — || May 8, 2006 || Mount Lemmon || Mount Lemmon Survey || — || align=right | 3.8 km || 
|-id=221 bgcolor=#E9E9E9
| 168221 Donjennings ||  ||  || May 1, 2006 || Kitt Peak || M. W. Buie || XIZ || align=right | 1.7 km || 
|-id=222 bgcolor=#fefefe
| 168222 || 2006 KU || — || May 18, 2006 || Palomar || NEAT || — || align=right | 2.6 km || 
|-id=223 bgcolor=#E9E9E9
| 168223 ||  || — || May 16, 2006 || Palomar || NEAT || — || align=right | 3.9 km || 
|-id=224 bgcolor=#E9E9E9
| 168224 ||  || — || May 19, 2006 || Mount Lemmon || Mount Lemmon Survey || — || align=right | 1.3 km || 
|-id=225 bgcolor=#E9E9E9
| 168225 ||  || — || May 19, 2006 || Mount Lemmon || Mount Lemmon Survey || — || align=right | 1.5 km || 
|-id=226 bgcolor=#E9E9E9
| 168226 ||  || — || May 20, 2006 || Mount Lemmon || Mount Lemmon Survey || MIS || align=right | 3.3 km || 
|-id=227 bgcolor=#E9E9E9
| 168227 ||  || — || May 20, 2006 || Kitt Peak || Spacewatch || — || align=right | 2.1 km || 
|-id=228 bgcolor=#fefefe
| 168228 ||  || — || May 20, 2006 || Kitt Peak || Spacewatch || NYS || align=right data-sort-value="0.93" | 930 m || 
|-id=229 bgcolor=#fefefe
| 168229 ||  || — || May 20, 2006 || Kitt Peak || Spacewatch || NYS || align=right | 2.5 km || 
|-id=230 bgcolor=#E9E9E9
| 168230 ||  || — || May 23, 2006 || Siding Spring || SSS || INO || align=right | 1.6 km || 
|-id=231 bgcolor=#d6d6d6
| 168231 ||  || — || May 18, 2006 || Palomar || NEAT || EOS || align=right | 3.1 km || 
|-id=232 bgcolor=#E9E9E9
| 168232 ||  || — || May 19, 2006 || Palomar || NEAT || — || align=right | 1.8 km || 
|-id=233 bgcolor=#E9E9E9
| 168233 ||  || — || May 21, 2006 || Kitt Peak || Spacewatch || — || align=right | 3.5 km || 
|-id=234 bgcolor=#E9E9E9
| 168234 Hsi Ching ||  ||  || May 25, 2006 || Lulin Observatory || Q.-z. Ye, H.-C. Lin || RAF || align=right | 1.5 km || 
|-id=235 bgcolor=#d6d6d6
| 168235 ||  || — || May 23, 2006 || Kitt Peak || Spacewatch || — || align=right | 3.6 km || 
|-id=236 bgcolor=#E9E9E9
| 168236 ||  || — || May 25, 2006 || Mount Lemmon || Mount Lemmon Survey || PAD || align=right | 3.5 km || 
|-id=237 bgcolor=#E9E9E9
| 168237 ||  || — || May 25, 2006 || Mount Lemmon || Mount Lemmon Survey || — || align=right | 1.9 km || 
|-id=238 bgcolor=#E9E9E9
| 168238 ||  || — || May 25, 2006 || Mount Lemmon || Mount Lemmon Survey || WIT || align=right | 1.3 km || 
|-id=239 bgcolor=#d6d6d6
| 168239 ||  || — || May 25, 2006 || Mount Lemmon || Mount Lemmon Survey || — || align=right | 4.5 km || 
|-id=240 bgcolor=#E9E9E9
| 168240 ||  || — || May 24, 2006 || Palomar || NEAT || — || align=right | 2.1 km || 
|-id=241 bgcolor=#E9E9E9
| 168241 ||  || — || May 21, 2006 || Catalina || CSS || JUN || align=right | 4.3 km || 
|-id=242 bgcolor=#E9E9E9
| 168242 ||  || — || May 24, 2006 || Palomar || NEAT || — || align=right | 1.9 km || 
|-id=243 bgcolor=#d6d6d6
| 168243 ||  || — || May 22, 2006 || Siding Spring || SSS || — || align=right | 5.1 km || 
|-id=244 bgcolor=#E9E9E9
| 168244 ||  || — || May 26, 2006 || Socorro || LINEAR || — || align=right | 3.5 km || 
|-id=245 bgcolor=#E9E9E9
| 168245 ||  || — || May 26, 2006 || Mount Lemmon || Mount Lemmon Survey || — || align=right | 1.5 km || 
|-id=246 bgcolor=#E9E9E9
| 168246 ||  || — || May 25, 2006 || Mount Lemmon || Mount Lemmon Survey || — || align=right | 1.9 km || 
|-id=247 bgcolor=#d6d6d6
| 168247 ||  || — || May 27, 2006 || Kitt Peak || Spacewatch || EMA || align=right | 4.9 km || 
|-id=248 bgcolor=#E9E9E9
| 168248 ||  || — || May 29, 2006 || Socorro || LINEAR || MAR || align=right | 1.5 km || 
|-id=249 bgcolor=#E9E9E9
| 168249 ||  || — || May 28, 2006 || Kitt Peak || Spacewatch || MAR || align=right | 2.0 km || 
|-id=250 bgcolor=#fefefe
| 168250 ||  || — || May 31, 2006 || Mount Lemmon || Mount Lemmon Survey || V || align=right | 1.1 km || 
|-id=251 bgcolor=#E9E9E9
| 168251 ||  || — || May 30, 2006 || Siding Spring || SSS || — || align=right | 2.6 km || 
|-id=252 bgcolor=#d6d6d6
| 168252 ||  || — || June 2, 2006 || Hibiscus || S. F. Hönig, N. Teamo || — || align=right | 4.7 km || 
|-id=253 bgcolor=#E9E9E9
| 168253 ||  || — || June 14, 2006 || Palomar || NEAT || NEM || align=right | 4.0 km || 
|-id=254 bgcolor=#fefefe
| 168254 ||  || — || June 15, 2006 || Kitt Peak || Spacewatch || — || align=right | 2.2 km || 
|-id=255 bgcolor=#d6d6d6
| 168255 ||  || — || June 6, 2006 || Siding Spring || SSS || — || align=right | 6.5 km || 
|-id=256 bgcolor=#fefefe
| 168256 || 2006 MY || — || June 16, 2006 || Kitt Peak || Spacewatch || — || align=right | 1.5 km || 
|-id=257 bgcolor=#E9E9E9
| 168257 ||  || — || June 16, 2006 || Kitt Peak || Spacewatch || MAR || align=right | 1.9 km || 
|-id=258 bgcolor=#E9E9E9
| 168258 ||  || — || June 16, 2006 || Palomar || NEAT || — || align=right | 2.5 km || 
|-id=259 bgcolor=#E9E9E9
| 168259 ||  || — || June 19, 2006 || Kitt Peak || Spacewatch || — || align=right | 3.0 km || 
|-id=260 bgcolor=#E9E9E9
| 168260 || 2006 NT || — || July 2, 2006 || Eskridge || Farpoint Obs. || — || align=right | 3.3 km || 
|-id=261 bgcolor=#d6d6d6
| 168261 Puglia ||  ||  || August 15, 2006 || Suno || V. S. Casulli || — || align=right | 4.7 km || 
|-id=262 bgcolor=#d6d6d6
| 168262 ||  || — || August 12, 2006 || Siding Spring || SSS || — || align=right | 6.6 km || 
|-id=263 bgcolor=#d6d6d6
| 168263 ||  || — || August 12, 2006 || Palomar || NEAT || — || align=right | 4.7 km || 
|-id=264 bgcolor=#d6d6d6
| 168264 ||  || — || August 13, 2006 || Palomar || NEAT || EOS || align=right | 6.5 km || 
|-id=265 bgcolor=#E9E9E9
| 168265 ||  || — || August 16, 2006 || Siding Spring || SSS || — || align=right | 3.7 km || 
|-id=266 bgcolor=#d6d6d6
| 168266 ||  || — || August 20, 2006 || Palomar || NEAT || — || align=right | 3.0 km || 
|-id=267 bgcolor=#d6d6d6
| 168267 ||  || — || September 30, 2006 || Catalina || CSS || — || align=right | 4.4 km || 
|-id=268 bgcolor=#E9E9E9
| 168268 ||  || — || August 5, 2007 || Črni Vrh || Črni Vrh || DOR || align=right | 4.7 km || 
|-id=269 bgcolor=#fefefe
| 168269 ||  || — || August 5, 2007 || Reedy Creek || J. Broughton || MAS || align=right | 1.3 km || 
|-id=270 bgcolor=#E9E9E9
| 168270 ||  || — || August 6, 2007 || Great Shefford || P. Birtwhistle || — || align=right | 3.8 km || 
|-id=271 bgcolor=#fefefe
| 168271 ||  || — || August 8, 2007 || Socorro || LINEAR || — || align=right | 2.0 km || 
|-id=272 bgcolor=#E9E9E9
| 168272 ||  || — || August 10, 2007 || Reedy Creek || J. Broughton || — || align=right | 2.9 km || 
|-id=273 bgcolor=#d6d6d6
| 168273 ||  || — || August 8, 2007 || Socorro || LINEAR || — || align=right | 5.1 km || 
|-id=274 bgcolor=#fefefe
| 168274 ||  || — || August 8, 2007 || Socorro || LINEAR || NYS || align=right | 1.3 km || 
|-id=275 bgcolor=#fefefe
| 168275 ||  || — || August 8, 2007 || Socorro || LINEAR || NYS || align=right | 1.3 km || 
|-id=276 bgcolor=#E9E9E9
| 168276 ||  || — || August 9, 2007 || Socorro || LINEAR || — || align=right | 3.6 km || 
|-id=277 bgcolor=#d6d6d6
| 168277 ||  || — || August 9, 2007 || Socorro || LINEAR || — || align=right | 7.4 km || 
|-id=278 bgcolor=#fefefe
| 168278 ||  || — || August 9, 2007 || Socorro || LINEAR || NYS || align=right data-sort-value="0.99" | 990 m || 
|-id=279 bgcolor=#fefefe
| 168279 ||  || — || August 9, 2007 || Socorro || LINEAR || NYS || align=right | 1.2 km || 
|-id=280 bgcolor=#C2FFFF
| 168280 ||  || — || August 18, 2007 || Purple Mountain || PMO NEO || L4 || align=right | 13 km || 
|-id=281 bgcolor=#fefefe
| 168281 ||  || — || August 21, 2007 || Anderson Mesa || LONEOS || — || align=right | 1.5 km || 
|-id=282 bgcolor=#d6d6d6
| 168282 ||  || — || August 22, 2007 || Socorro || LINEAR || THM || align=right | 4.0 km || 
|-id=283 bgcolor=#d6d6d6
| 168283 ||  || — || September 3, 2007 || Catalina || CSS || URS || align=right | 5.6 km || 
|-id=284 bgcolor=#E9E9E9
| 168284 ||  || — || September 8, 2007 || Anderson Mesa || LONEOS || — || align=right | 3.4 km || 
|-id=285 bgcolor=#d6d6d6
| 168285 ||  || — || September 10, 2007 || Mount Lemmon || Mount Lemmon Survey || — || align=right | 4.7 km || 
|-id=286 bgcolor=#fefefe
| 168286 ||  || — || September 11, 2007 || Kitt Peak || Spacewatch || — || align=right data-sort-value="0.85" | 850 m || 
|-id=287 bgcolor=#fefefe
| 168287 ||  || — || September 14, 2007 || Socorro || LINEAR || — || align=right | 1.3 km || 
|-id=288 bgcolor=#d6d6d6
| 168288 ||  || — || September 11, 2007 || Kitt Peak || Spacewatch || — || align=right | 2.6 km || 
|-id=289 bgcolor=#fefefe
| 168289 || 2007 SD || — || September 17, 2007 || RAS || A. Lowe || NYS || align=right | 1.1 km || 
|-id=290 bgcolor=#fefefe
| 168290 || 2045 P-L || — || September 24, 1960 || Palomar || PLS || — || align=right | 2.0 km || 
|-id=291 bgcolor=#d6d6d6
| 168291 || 3041 P-L || — || September 24, 1960 || Palomar || PLS || — || align=right | 4.1 km || 
|-id=292 bgcolor=#d6d6d6
| 168292 || 4267 P-L || — || September 25, 1960 || Palomar || PLS || — || align=right | 4.9 km || 
|-id=293 bgcolor=#fefefe
| 168293 || 4724 P-L || — || September 24, 1960 || Palomar || PLS || — || align=right data-sort-value="0.98" | 980 m || 
|-id=294 bgcolor=#fefefe
| 168294 || 4883 P-L || — || September 24, 1960 || Palomar || PLS || NYS || align=right data-sort-value="0.87" | 870 m || 
|-id=295 bgcolor=#d6d6d6
| 168295 || 6280 P-L || — || September 24, 1960 || Palomar || PLS || HYG || align=right | 4.6 km || 
|-id=296 bgcolor=#d6d6d6
| 168296 || 6740 P-L || — || September 24, 1960 || Palomar || PLS || — || align=right | 5.0 km || 
|-id=297 bgcolor=#fefefe
| 168297 || 7575 P-L || — || October 17, 1960 || Palomar || PLS || FLO || align=right | 1.2 km || 
|-id=298 bgcolor=#fefefe
| 168298 || 3230 T-1 || — || March 26, 1971 || Palomar || PLS || KLI || align=right | 3.1 km || 
|-id=299 bgcolor=#d6d6d6
| 168299 || 1048 T-2 || — || September 29, 1973 || Palomar || PLS || URS || align=right | 6.6 km || 
|-id=300 bgcolor=#d6d6d6
| 168300 || 1217 T-2 || — || September 29, 1973 || Palomar || PLS || — || align=right | 4.5 km || 
|}

168301–168400 

|-bgcolor=#E9E9E9
| 168301 || 1315 T-2 || — || September 29, 1973 || Palomar || PLS || ADE || align=right | 3.9 km || 
|-id=302 bgcolor=#fefefe
| 168302 || 1428 T-2 || — || September 29, 1973 || Palomar || PLS || — || align=right | 1.1 km || 
|-id=303 bgcolor=#d6d6d6
| 168303 || 2223 T-2 || — || September 29, 1973 || Palomar || PLS || — || align=right | 3.9 km || 
|-id=304 bgcolor=#d6d6d6
| 168304 || 3125 T-2 || — || September 30, 1973 || Palomar || PLS || — || align=right | 7.2 km || 
|-id=305 bgcolor=#E9E9E9
| 168305 || 3205 T-2 || — || September 30, 1973 || Palomar || PLS || — || align=right | 2.2 km || 
|-id=306 bgcolor=#d6d6d6
| 168306 || 4255 T-2 || — || September 29, 1973 || Palomar || PLS || — || align=right | 5.7 km || 
|-id=307 bgcolor=#fefefe
| 168307 || 1206 T-3 || — || October 17, 1977 || Palomar || PLS || — || align=right | 3.0 km || 
|-id=308 bgcolor=#E9E9E9
| 168308 || 1216 T-3 || — || October 17, 1977 || Palomar || PLS || JUN || align=right | 1.2 km || 
|-id=309 bgcolor=#fefefe
| 168309 || 2167 T-3 || — || October 16, 1977 || Palomar || PLS || V || align=right | 1.2 km || 
|-id=310 bgcolor=#fefefe
| 168310 || 2316 T-3 || — || October 16, 1977 || Palomar || PLS || — || align=right | 1.4 km || 
|-id=311 bgcolor=#fefefe
| 168311 || 3312 T-3 || — || October 16, 1977 || Palomar || PLS || — || align=right | 1.0 km || 
|-id=312 bgcolor=#E9E9E9
| 168312 || 3396 T-3 || — || October 16, 1977 || Palomar || PLS || MIS || align=right | 3.4 km || 
|-id=313 bgcolor=#E9E9E9
| 168313 || 5009 T-3 || — || October 16, 1977 || Palomar || PLS || — || align=right | 2.4 km || 
|-id=314 bgcolor=#fefefe
| 168314 ||  || — || March 6, 1981 || Siding Spring || S. J. Bus || FLO || align=right data-sort-value="0.91" | 910 m || 
|-id=315 bgcolor=#FA8072
| 168315 ||  || — || September 13, 1982 || Harvard Observatory || Oak Ridge Observatory || fast? || align=right | 1.4 km || 
|-id=316 bgcolor=#E9E9E9
| 168316 || 1982 WD || — || November 25, 1982 || Palomar || R. S. Dunbar || — || align=right | 3.8 km || 
|-id=317 bgcolor=#E9E9E9
| 168317 ||  || — || September 2, 1988 || La Silla || H. Debehogne || — || align=right | 4.4 km || 
|-id=318 bgcolor=#FFC2E0
| 168318 || 1989 DA || — || February 27, 1989 || Palomar || J. Phinney || APOPHAcritical || align=right data-sort-value="0.9" | 900 m || 
|-id=319 bgcolor=#E9E9E9
| 168319 ||  || — || September 15, 1990 || Palomar || H. E. Holt || — || align=right | 2.2 km || 
|-id=320 bgcolor=#E9E9E9
| 168320 ||  || — || November 16, 1990 || La Silla || E. W. Elst || JUN || align=right | 6.0 km || 
|-id=321 bgcolor=#E9E9E9
| 168321 Josephschmidt ||  ||  || September 12, 1991 || Tautenburg Observatory || F. Börngen, L. D. Schmadel || — || align=right | 3.7 km || 
|-id=322 bgcolor=#E9E9E9
| 168322 ||  || — || March 2, 1992 || La Silla || UESAC || — || align=right | 1.5 km || 
|-id=323 bgcolor=#fefefe
| 168323 ||  || — || March 1, 1992 || La Silla || UESAC || FLO || align=right data-sort-value="0.98" | 980 m || 
|-id=324 bgcolor=#d6d6d6
| 168324 ||  || — || March 17, 1993 || La Silla || UESAC || HYG || align=right | 3.2 km || 
|-id=325 bgcolor=#d6d6d6
| 168325 ||  || — || March 21, 1993 || La Silla || UESAC || HYG || align=right | 4.4 km || 
|-id=326 bgcolor=#d6d6d6
| 168326 ||  || — || March 19, 1993 || La Silla || UESAC || — || align=right | 3.5 km || 
|-id=327 bgcolor=#d6d6d6
| 168327 ||  || — || March 19, 1993 || La Silla || UESAC || — || align=right | 3.9 km || 
|-id=328 bgcolor=#fefefe
| 168328 ||  || — || July 12, 1993 || La Silla || E. W. Elst || — || align=right data-sort-value="0.87" | 870 m || 
|-id=329 bgcolor=#E9E9E9
| 168329 ||  || — || October 9, 1993 || Kitt Peak || Spacewatch || — || align=right | 2.4 km || 
|-id=330 bgcolor=#E9E9E9
| 168330 ||  || — || October 10, 1993 || Kitt Peak || Spacewatch || MRX || align=right | 1.8 km || 
|-id=331 bgcolor=#E9E9E9
| 168331 ||  || — || October 10, 1993 || Kitt Peak || Spacewatch || — || align=right | 2.7 km || 
|-id=332 bgcolor=#E9E9E9
| 168332 ||  || — || October 9, 1993 || La Silla || E. W. Elst || HOF || align=right | 3.7 km || 
|-id=333 bgcolor=#fefefe
| 168333 ||  || — || February 8, 1994 || La Silla || E. W. Elst || NYS || align=right | 1.2 km || 
|-id=334 bgcolor=#E9E9E9
| 168334 ||  || — || August 12, 1994 || Siding Spring || R. H. McNaught || — || align=right | 2.6 km || 
|-id=335 bgcolor=#E9E9E9
| 168335 ||  || — || August 12, 1994 || La Silla || E. W. Elst || — || align=right | 2.3 km || 
|-id=336 bgcolor=#E9E9E9
| 168336 ||  || — || August 12, 1994 || La Silla || E. W. Elst || MIS || align=right | 4.3 km || 
|-id=337 bgcolor=#d6d6d6
| 168337 ||  || — || September 27, 1994 || Kitt Peak || Spacewatch || — || align=right | 4.7 km || 
|-id=338 bgcolor=#E9E9E9
| 168338 ||  || — || October 29, 1994 || Kitt Peak || Spacewatch || ADE || align=right | 2.9 km || 
|-id=339 bgcolor=#fefefe
| 168339 ||  || — || March 26, 1995 || Kitt Peak || Spacewatch || — || align=right | 1.3 km || 
|-id=340 bgcolor=#fefefe
| 168340 ||  || — || May 4, 1995 || Kitt Peak || Spacewatch || H || align=right | 1.3 km || 
|-id=341 bgcolor=#fefefe
| 168341 ||  || — || June 23, 1995 || Kitt Peak || Spacewatch || — || align=right | 1.3 km || 
|-id=342 bgcolor=#fefefe
| 168342 ||  || — || June 29, 1995 || Kitt Peak || Spacewatch || V || align=right | 1.1 km || 
|-id=343 bgcolor=#d6d6d6
| 168343 ||  || — || July 22, 1995 || Kitt Peak || Spacewatch || — || align=right | 5.1 km || 
|-id=344 bgcolor=#d6d6d6
| 168344 ||  || — || July 23, 1995 || Kitt Peak || Spacewatch || HYG || align=right | 3.4 km || 
|-id=345 bgcolor=#fefefe
| 168345 ||  || — || September 20, 1995 || Kitt Peak || Spacewatch || MAS || align=right | 1.2 km || 
|-id=346 bgcolor=#E9E9E9
| 168346 ||  || — || September 29, 1995 || Kitt Peak || Spacewatch || — || align=right | 1.3 km || 
|-id=347 bgcolor=#fefefe
| 168347 ||  || — || October 17, 1995 || Kitt Peak || Spacewatch || MAS || align=right | 1.3 km || 
|-id=348 bgcolor=#d6d6d6
| 168348 ||  || — || October 19, 1995 || Kitt Peak || Spacewatch || — || align=right | 3.2 km || 
|-id=349 bgcolor=#d6d6d6
| 168349 ||  || — || October 20, 1995 || Kitt Peak || Spacewatch || — || align=right | 4.2 km || 
|-id=350 bgcolor=#E9E9E9
| 168350 ||  || — || October 24, 1995 || Kitt Peak || Spacewatch || — || align=right data-sort-value="0.97" | 970 m || 
|-id=351 bgcolor=#E9E9E9
| 168351 ||  || — || October 20, 1995 || Kitt Peak || Spacewatch || — || align=right data-sort-value="0.99" | 990 m || 
|-id=352 bgcolor=#d6d6d6
| 168352 ||  || — || November 14, 1995 || Kitt Peak || Spacewatch || HYG || align=right | 3.8 km || 
|-id=353 bgcolor=#d6d6d6
| 168353 ||  || — || November 14, 1995 || Kitt Peak || Spacewatch || URS || align=right | 5.5 km || 
|-id=354 bgcolor=#E9E9E9
| 168354 ||  || — || January 12, 1996 || Kitt Peak || Spacewatch || — || align=right | 1.4 km || 
|-id=355 bgcolor=#fefefe
| 168355 ||  || — || January 13, 1996 || Kitt Peak || Spacewatch || — || align=right data-sort-value="0.94" | 940 m || 
|-id=356 bgcolor=#E9E9E9
| 168356 ||  || — || January 12, 1996 || Kitt Peak || Spacewatch || — || align=right | 2.5 km || 
|-id=357 bgcolor=#fefefe
| 168357 ||  || — || February 15, 1996 || Kitt Peak || Spacewatch || — || align=right | 1.5 km || 
|-id=358 bgcolor=#fefefe
| 168358 Casca ||  ||  || February 24, 1996 || NRC-DAO || D. D. Balam || — || align=right | 1.3 km || 
|-id=359 bgcolor=#E9E9E9
| 168359 ||  || — || February 29, 1996 || Haleakala || AMOS || — || align=right | 3.4 km || 
|-id=360 bgcolor=#d6d6d6
| 168360 || 1996 PC || — || August 6, 1996 || Prescott || P. G. Comba || — || align=right | 3.9 km || 
|-id=361 bgcolor=#fefefe
| 168361 ||  || — || September 14, 1996 || Kitt Peak || Spacewatch || — || align=right | 1.1 km || 
|-id=362 bgcolor=#C2FFFF
| 168362 ||  || — || September 11, 1996 || La Silla || UDTS || L4 || align=right | 15 km || 
|-id=363 bgcolor=#fefefe
| 168363 ||  || — || October 4, 1996 || Kitt Peak || Spacewatch || — || align=right | 1.3 km || 
|-id=364 bgcolor=#C2FFFF
| 168364 ||  || — || October 5, 1996 || Kitt Peak || Spacewatch || L4 || align=right | 15 km || 
|-id=365 bgcolor=#fefefe
| 168365 ||  || — || October 6, 1996 || Kitt Peak || Spacewatch || MAS || align=right data-sort-value="0.86" | 860 m || 
|-id=366 bgcolor=#fefefe
| 168366 ||  || — || October 8, 1996 || La Silla || E. W. Elst || — || align=right | 2.8 km || 
|-id=367 bgcolor=#fefefe
| 168367 ||  || — || October 18, 1996 || Caussols || ODAS || V || align=right | 1.0 km || 
|-id=368 bgcolor=#d6d6d6
| 168368 ||  || — || November 18, 1996 || Kitt Peak || Spacewatch || — || align=right | 5.2 km || 
|-id=369 bgcolor=#d6d6d6
| 168369 ||  || — || December 1, 1996 || Kitt Peak || Spacewatch || — || align=right | 4.5 km || 
|-id=370 bgcolor=#d6d6d6
| 168370 ||  || — || December 4, 1996 || Kitt Peak || Spacewatch || THM || align=right | 3.1 km || 
|-id=371 bgcolor=#d6d6d6
| 168371 ||  || — || December 4, 1996 || Kitt Peak || Spacewatch || — || align=right | 4.5 km || 
|-id=372 bgcolor=#d6d6d6
| 168372 ||  || — || December 12, 1996 || Kitt Peak || Spacewatch || — || align=right | 4.9 km || 
|-id=373 bgcolor=#fefefe
| 168373 ||  || — || February 3, 1997 || Kitt Peak || Spacewatch || NYS || align=right data-sort-value="0.81" | 810 m || 
|-id=374 bgcolor=#d6d6d6
| 168374 ||  || — || February 4, 1997 || Kitt Peak || Spacewatch || THM || align=right | 3.3 km || 
|-id=375 bgcolor=#E9E9E9
| 168375 ||  || — || March 3, 1997 || Kitt Peak || Spacewatch || MAR || align=right | 1.3 km || 
|-id=376 bgcolor=#E9E9E9
| 168376 ||  || — || March 4, 1997 || Kitt Peak || Spacewatch || — || align=right | 1.2 km || 
|-id=377 bgcolor=#fefefe
| 168377 ||  || — || March 8, 1997 || Kitt Peak || Spacewatch || V || align=right | 1.3 km || 
|-id=378 bgcolor=#FFC2E0
| 168378 ||  || — || March 12, 1997 || Kitt Peak || Spacewatch || AMO +1km || align=right | 1.1 km || 
|-id=379 bgcolor=#fefefe
| 168379 ||  || — || April 3, 1997 || Socorro || LINEAR || NYS || align=right | 1.2 km || 
|-id=380 bgcolor=#E9E9E9
| 168380 ||  || — || April 30, 1997 || Kitt Peak || Spacewatch || — || align=right | 2.0 km || 
|-id=381 bgcolor=#FA8072
| 168381 ||  || — || June 10, 1997 || Xinglong || SCAP || — || align=right | 1.3 km || 
|-id=382 bgcolor=#E9E9E9
| 168382 ||  || — || June 26, 1997 || Kitt Peak || Spacewatch || — || align=right | 4.1 km || 
|-id=383 bgcolor=#fefefe
| 168383 ||  || — || June 29, 1997 || Kitt Peak || Spacewatch || FLO || align=right | 1.3 km || 
|-id=384 bgcolor=#E9E9E9
| 168384 ||  || — || July 6, 1997 || Kitt Peak || Spacewatch || — || align=right | 2.8 km || 
|-id=385 bgcolor=#FA8072
| 168385 ||  || — || September 5, 1997 || Caussols || ODAS || — || align=right | 1.3 km || 
|-id=386 bgcolor=#d6d6d6
| 168386 ||  || — || September 29, 1997 || Kitt Peak || Spacewatch || KOR || align=right | 1.9 km || 
|-id=387 bgcolor=#d6d6d6
| 168387 ||  || — || September 30, 1997 || Kitt Peak || Spacewatch || KOR || align=right | 1.7 km || 
|-id=388 bgcolor=#fefefe
| 168388 ||  || — || October 1, 1997 || Caussols || ODAS || — || align=right | 2.6 km || 
|-id=389 bgcolor=#E9E9E9
| 168389 ||  || — || October 2, 1997 || Kitt Peak || Spacewatch || — || align=right | 2.8 km || 
|-id=390 bgcolor=#fefefe
| 168390 ||  || — || November 23, 1997 || Kitt Peak || Spacewatch || FLO || align=right | 1.1 km || 
|-id=391 bgcolor=#E9E9E9
| 168391 ||  || — || November 29, 1997 || Socorro || LINEAR || — || align=right | 4.4 km || 
|-id=392 bgcolor=#d6d6d6
| 168392 ||  || — || December 31, 1997 || Kitt Peak || Spacewatch || — || align=right | 3.8 km || 
|-id=393 bgcolor=#d6d6d6
| 168393 ||  || — || January 6, 1998 || Kitt Peak || Spacewatch || — || align=right | 3.4 km || 
|-id=394 bgcolor=#d6d6d6
| 168394 ||  || — || January 19, 1998 || Nachi-Katsuura || Y. Shimizu, T. Urata || — || align=right | 8.2 km || 
|-id=395 bgcolor=#fefefe
| 168395 ||  || — || January 23, 1998 || Kitt Peak || Spacewatch || — || align=right | 3.5 km || 
|-id=396 bgcolor=#d6d6d6
| 168396 ||  || — || January 26, 1998 || Kitt Peak || Spacewatch || — || align=right | 5.9 km || 
|-id=397 bgcolor=#fefefe
| 168397 ||  || — || January 29, 1998 || Kitt Peak || Spacewatch || — || align=right data-sort-value="0.92" | 920 m || 
|-id=398 bgcolor=#fefefe
| 168398 || 1998 DG || — || February 17, 1998 || Modra || A. Galád, A. Pravda || NYS || align=right | 1.2 km || 
|-id=399 bgcolor=#d6d6d6
| 168399 ||  || — || February 24, 1998 || Kitt Peak || Spacewatch || THM || align=right | 3.9 km || 
|-id=400 bgcolor=#d6d6d6
| 168400 ||  || — || March 1, 1998 || Kitt Peak || Spacewatch || VER || align=right | 4.8 km || 
|}

168401–168500 

|-bgcolor=#fefefe
| 168401 ||  || — || March 1, 1998 || La Silla || E. W. Elst || — || align=right | 1.5 km || 
|-id=402 bgcolor=#fefefe
| 168402 ||  || — || March 20, 1998 || Socorro || LINEAR || — || align=right | 1.4 km || 
|-id=403 bgcolor=#fefefe
| 168403 ||  || — || March 24, 1998 || Socorro || LINEAR || V || align=right | 1.2 km || 
|-id=404 bgcolor=#fefefe
| 168404 ||  || — || March 24, 1998 || Socorro || LINEAR || FLO || align=right | 1.3 km || 
|-id=405 bgcolor=#fefefe
| 168405 ||  || — || March 31, 1998 || Socorro || LINEAR || — || align=right | 1.6 km || 
|-id=406 bgcolor=#fefefe
| 168406 ||  || — || March 20, 1998 || Socorro || LINEAR || — || align=right | 1.3 km || 
|-id=407 bgcolor=#fefefe
| 168407 ||  || — || March 28, 1998 || Socorro || LINEAR || — || align=right | 1.0 km || 
|-id=408 bgcolor=#fefefe
| 168408 ||  || — || April 19, 1998 || Kitt Peak || Spacewatch || — || align=right data-sort-value="0.99" | 990 m || 
|-id=409 bgcolor=#d6d6d6
| 168409 ||  || — || April 17, 1998 || Kitt Peak || Spacewatch || EOS || align=right | 3.5 km || 
|-id=410 bgcolor=#fefefe
| 168410 ||  || — || April 21, 1998 || Socorro || LINEAR || MAS || align=right | 1.5 km || 
|-id=411 bgcolor=#d6d6d6
| 168411 ||  || — || April 23, 1998 || Socorro || LINEAR || fast? || align=right | 4.8 km || 
|-id=412 bgcolor=#fefefe
| 168412 ||  || — || April 19, 1998 || Socorro || LINEAR || NYS || align=right | 1.3 km || 
|-id=413 bgcolor=#E9E9E9
| 168413 ||  || — || August 17, 1998 || Socorro || LINEAR || — || align=right | 3.1 km || 
|-id=414 bgcolor=#E9E9E9
| 168414 ||  || — || August 17, 1998 || Socorro || LINEAR || — || align=right | 2.1 km || 
|-id=415 bgcolor=#E9E9E9
| 168415 ||  || — || August 17, 1998 || Socorro || LINEAR || — || align=right | 1.5 km || 
|-id=416 bgcolor=#E9E9E9
| 168416 ||  || — || August 26, 1998 || Xinglong || SCAP || — || align=right | 2.0 km || 
|-id=417 bgcolor=#E9E9E9
| 168417 ||  || — || August 17, 1998 || Socorro || LINEAR || ADE || align=right | 4.3 km || 
|-id=418 bgcolor=#E9E9E9
| 168418 ||  || — || August 17, 1998 || Socorro || LINEAR || IAN || align=right | 1.9 km || 
|-id=419 bgcolor=#E9E9E9
| 168419 ||  || — || August 17, 1998 || Socorro || LINEAR || — || align=right | 4.1 km || 
|-id=420 bgcolor=#E9E9E9
| 168420 ||  || — || August 30, 1998 || Kitt Peak || Spacewatch || — || align=right | 1.8 km || 
|-id=421 bgcolor=#E9E9E9
| 168421 ||  || — || August 24, 1998 || Socorro || LINEAR || — || align=right | 2.3 km || 
|-id=422 bgcolor=#E9E9E9
| 168422 ||  || — || August 24, 1998 || Socorro || LINEAR || — || align=right | 4.5 km || 
|-id=423 bgcolor=#E9E9E9
| 168423 ||  || — || August 19, 1998 || Socorro || LINEAR || ADE || align=right | 4.5 km || 
|-id=424 bgcolor=#E9E9E9
| 168424 ||  || — || August 26, 1998 || La Silla || E. W. Elst || — || align=right | 2.1 km || 
|-id=425 bgcolor=#E9E9E9
| 168425 ||  || — || September 14, 1998 || Socorro || LINEAR || MIT || align=right | 3.9 km || 
|-id=426 bgcolor=#E9E9E9
| 168426 ||  || — || September 16, 1998 || Anderson Mesa || LONEOS || — || align=right | 4.8 km || 
|-id=427 bgcolor=#E9E9E9
| 168427 ||  || — || September 19, 1998 || Socorro || LINEAR || IAN || align=right | 1.6 km || 
|-id=428 bgcolor=#E9E9E9
| 168428 ||  || — || September 26, 1998 || Socorro || LINEAR || — || align=right | 2.7 km || 
|-id=429 bgcolor=#E9E9E9
| 168429 ||  || — || September 26, 1998 || Socorro || LINEAR || — || align=right | 2.2 km || 
|-id=430 bgcolor=#E9E9E9
| 168430 ||  || — || September 26, 1998 || Socorro || LINEAR || — || align=right | 2.4 km || 
|-id=431 bgcolor=#E9E9E9
| 168431 ||  || — || September 26, 1998 || Socorro || LINEAR || MAR || align=right | 2.2 km || 
|-id=432 bgcolor=#E9E9E9
| 168432 ||  || — || October 12, 1998 || Kitt Peak || Spacewatch || — || align=right | 3.0 km || 
|-id=433 bgcolor=#E9E9E9
| 168433 ||  || — || October 22, 1998 || Caussols || ODAS || — || align=right | 3.2 km || 
|-id=434 bgcolor=#E9E9E9
| 168434 ||  || — || November 10, 1998 || Socorro || LINEAR || — || align=right | 4.0 km || 
|-id=435 bgcolor=#E9E9E9
| 168435 ||  || — || November 10, 1998 || Socorro || LINEAR || ADE || align=right | 3.8 km || 
|-id=436 bgcolor=#E9E9E9
| 168436 ||  || — || November 10, 1998 || Socorro || LINEAR || DOR || align=right | 3.9 km || 
|-id=437 bgcolor=#E9E9E9
| 168437 ||  || — || November 10, 1998 || Socorro || LINEAR || — || align=right | 2.3 km || 
|-id=438 bgcolor=#E9E9E9
| 168438 ||  || — || November 14, 1998 || Kitt Peak || Spacewatch || — || align=right | 4.5 km || 
|-id=439 bgcolor=#E9E9E9
| 168439 ||  || — || November 13, 1998 || Socorro || LINEAR || — || align=right | 5.0 km || 
|-id=440 bgcolor=#E9E9E9
| 168440 ||  || — || November 17, 1998 || Caussols || ODAS || WIT || align=right | 1.6 km || 
|-id=441 bgcolor=#E9E9E9
| 168441 ||  || — || November 18, 1998 || Gekko || T. Kagawa || — || align=right | 2.9 km || 
|-id=442 bgcolor=#d6d6d6
| 168442 ||  || — || December 8, 1998 || Kitt Peak || Spacewatch || KOR || align=right | 2.2 km || 
|-id=443 bgcolor=#E9E9E9
| 168443 ||  || — || December 12, 1998 || Višnjan Observatory || K. Korlević || — || align=right | 3.0 km || 
|-id=444 bgcolor=#E9E9E9
| 168444 ||  || — || December 11, 1998 || Kitt Peak || Spacewatch || MRX || align=right | 1.8 km || 
|-id=445 bgcolor=#E9E9E9
| 168445 ||  || — || December 21, 1998 || Uenohara || N. Kawasato || — || align=right | 6.0 km || 
|-id=446 bgcolor=#E9E9E9
| 168446 ||  || — || December 26, 1998 || Kitt Peak || Spacewatch || — || align=right | 3.1 km || 
|-id=447 bgcolor=#fefefe
| 168447 ||  || — || January 8, 1999 || Kitt Peak || Spacewatch || FLO || align=right | 1.0 km || 
|-id=448 bgcolor=#E9E9E9
| 168448 ||  || — || January 6, 1999 || Anderson Mesa || LONEOS || Tj (2.96) || align=right | 5.5 km || 
|-id=449 bgcolor=#E9E9E9
| 168449 ||  || — || January 7, 1999 || Kitt Peak || Spacewatch || — || align=right | 3.4 km || 
|-id=450 bgcolor=#E9E9E9
| 168450 ||  || — || January 11, 1999 || Xinglong || SCAP || JUN || align=right | 1.9 km || 
|-id=451 bgcolor=#d6d6d6
| 168451 ||  || — || February 10, 1999 || Socorro || LINEAR || — || align=right | 2.9 km || 
|-id=452 bgcolor=#d6d6d6
| 168452 ||  || — || February 12, 1999 || Socorro || LINEAR || — || align=right | 4.3 km || 
|-id=453 bgcolor=#d6d6d6
| 168453 ||  || — || February 6, 1999 || Mauna Kea || C. Veillet || KOR || align=right | 1.5 km || 
|-id=454 bgcolor=#d6d6d6
| 168454 ||  || — || March 14, 1999 || Kitt Peak || Spacewatch || — || align=right | 4.2 km || 
|-id=455 bgcolor=#fefefe
| 168455 ||  || — || March 16, 1999 || Kitt Peak || Spacewatch || V || align=right data-sort-value="0.85" | 850 m || 
|-id=456 bgcolor=#E9E9E9
| 168456 ||  || — || March 16, 1999 || Kitt Peak || Spacewatch || HNA || align=right | 3.3 km || 
|-id=457 bgcolor=#fefefe
| 168457 ||  || — || March 18, 1999 || Kitt Peak || Spacewatch || — || align=right | 1.4 km || 
|-id=458 bgcolor=#d6d6d6
| 168458 ||  || — || March 18, 1999 || Kitt Peak || Spacewatch || — || align=right | 5.8 km || 
|-id=459 bgcolor=#d6d6d6
| 168459 ||  || — || March 19, 1999 || Kitt Peak || Spacewatch || — || align=right | 4.5 km || 
|-id=460 bgcolor=#fefefe
| 168460 ||  || — || April 7, 1999 || Kitt Peak || Spacewatch || — || align=right | 1.2 km || 
|-id=461 bgcolor=#d6d6d6
| 168461 ||  || — || April 17, 1999 || Kitt Peak || Spacewatch || — || align=right | 5.3 km || 
|-id=462 bgcolor=#fefefe
| 168462 ||  || — || May 10, 1999 || Socorro || LINEAR || FLO || align=right | 1.0 km || 
|-id=463 bgcolor=#d6d6d6
| 168463 ||  || — || May 10, 1999 || Socorro || LINEAR || — || align=right | 5.9 km || 
|-id=464 bgcolor=#fefefe
| 168464 ||  || — || May 12, 1999 || Socorro || LINEAR || FLO || align=right | 1.1 km || 
|-id=465 bgcolor=#d6d6d6
| 168465 ||  || — || May 12, 1999 || Socorro || LINEAR || — || align=right | 7.1 km || 
|-id=466 bgcolor=#d6d6d6
| 168466 ||  || — || May 13, 1999 || Socorro || LINEAR || — || align=right | 6.3 km || 
|-id=467 bgcolor=#d6d6d6
| 168467 ||  || — || May 10, 1999 || Socorro || LINEAR || — || align=right | 5.3 km || 
|-id=468 bgcolor=#fefefe
| 168468 ||  || — || May 16, 1999 || Kitt Peak || Spacewatch || NYS || align=right data-sort-value="0.88" | 880 m || 
|-id=469 bgcolor=#fefefe
| 168469 ||  || — || May 18, 1999 || Socorro || LINEAR || FLO || align=right | 1.2 km || 
|-id=470 bgcolor=#fefefe
| 168470 ||  || — || June 10, 1999 || Kitt Peak || Spacewatch || — || align=right | 1.3 km || 
|-id=471 bgcolor=#fefefe
| 168471 ||  || — || June 12, 1999 || Kitt Peak || Spacewatch || — || align=right | 1.3 km || 
|-id=472 bgcolor=#fefefe
| 168472 ||  || — || August 8, 1999 || Uenohara || N. Kawasato || — || align=right | 3.0 km || 
|-id=473 bgcolor=#fefefe
| 168473 ||  || — || August 20, 1999 || Gnosca || S. Sposetti || — || align=right | 1.5 km || 
|-id=474 bgcolor=#E9E9E9
| 168474 ||  || — || September 4, 1999 || Catalina || CSS || — || align=right | 1.7 km || 
|-id=475 bgcolor=#fefefe
| 168475 ||  || — || September 7, 1999 || Socorro || LINEAR || MAS || align=right | 1.3 km || 
|-id=476 bgcolor=#fefefe
| 168476 ||  || — || September 8, 1999 || Socorro || LINEAR || H || align=right data-sort-value="0.90" | 900 m || 
|-id=477 bgcolor=#fefefe
| 168477 ||  || — || September 8, 1999 || Socorro || LINEAR || H || align=right | 1.2 km || 
|-id=478 bgcolor=#fefefe
| 168478 ||  || — || September 7, 1999 || Socorro || LINEAR || — || align=right | 2.9 km || 
|-id=479 bgcolor=#fefefe
| 168479 ||  || — || September 7, 1999 || Socorro || LINEAR || NYS || align=right | 3.3 km || 
|-id=480 bgcolor=#fefefe
| 168480 ||  || — || September 7, 1999 || Socorro || LINEAR || — || align=right | 1.7 km || 
|-id=481 bgcolor=#fefefe
| 168481 ||  || — || September 7, 1999 || Socorro || LINEAR || MAS || align=right | 1.4 km || 
|-id=482 bgcolor=#fefefe
| 168482 ||  || — || September 9, 1999 || Socorro || LINEAR || — || align=right | 1.3 km || 
|-id=483 bgcolor=#E9E9E9
| 168483 ||  || — || September 13, 1999 || Kitt Peak || Spacewatch || — || align=right | 1.2 km || 
|-id=484 bgcolor=#fefefe
| 168484 ||  || — || September 9, 1999 || Socorro || LINEAR || — || align=right | 2.1 km || 
|-id=485 bgcolor=#fefefe
| 168485 ||  || — || September 9, 1999 || Socorro || LINEAR || — || align=right | 1.8 km || 
|-id=486 bgcolor=#fefefe
| 168486 ||  || — || September 9, 1999 || Socorro || LINEAR || — || align=right | 2.7 km || 
|-id=487 bgcolor=#fefefe
| 168487 ||  || — || September 9, 1999 || Socorro || LINEAR || — || align=right | 1.3 km || 
|-id=488 bgcolor=#E9E9E9
| 168488 ||  || — || September 9, 1999 || Socorro || LINEAR || — || align=right | 1.7 km || 
|-id=489 bgcolor=#fefefe
| 168489 ||  || — || September 9, 1999 || Socorro || LINEAR || — || align=right | 1.2 km || 
|-id=490 bgcolor=#fefefe
| 168490 ||  || — || September 9, 1999 || Socorro || LINEAR || — || align=right | 2.8 km || 
|-id=491 bgcolor=#E9E9E9
| 168491 ||  || — || September 9, 1999 || Socorro || LINEAR || — || align=right | 1.9 km || 
|-id=492 bgcolor=#fefefe
| 168492 ||  || — || September 9, 1999 || Socorro || LINEAR || MAS || align=right | 1.3 km || 
|-id=493 bgcolor=#fefefe
| 168493 ||  || — || September 9, 1999 || Socorro || LINEAR || NYS || align=right | 1.4 km || 
|-id=494 bgcolor=#fefefe
| 168494 ||  || — || September 9, 1999 || Socorro || LINEAR || NYS || align=right | 1.3 km || 
|-id=495 bgcolor=#fefefe
| 168495 ||  || — || September 9, 1999 || Socorro || LINEAR || MAS || align=right | 1.4 km || 
|-id=496 bgcolor=#fefefe
| 168496 ||  || — || September 11, 1999 || Socorro || LINEAR || NYS || align=right | 1.2 km || 
|-id=497 bgcolor=#fefefe
| 168497 ||  || — || September 8, 1999 || Socorro || LINEAR || — || align=right | 1.7 km || 
|-id=498 bgcolor=#E9E9E9
| 168498 ||  || — || September 8, 1999 || Socorro || LINEAR || MAR || align=right | 2.0 km || 
|-id=499 bgcolor=#fefefe
| 168499 ||  || — || September 7, 1999 || Socorro || LINEAR || — || align=right | 1.8 km || 
|-id=500 bgcolor=#fefefe
| 168500 ||  || — || September 7, 1999 || Socorro || LINEAR || ERI || align=right | 4.4 km || 
|}

168501–168600 

|-bgcolor=#fefefe
| 168501 ||  || — || September 4, 1999 || Catalina || CSS || — || align=right | 4.8 km || 
|-id=502 bgcolor=#fefefe
| 168502 ||  || — || September 29, 1999 || Xinglong || SCAP || — || align=right | 1.2 km || 
|-id=503 bgcolor=#fefefe
| 168503 ||  || — || October 6, 1999 || Višnjan Observatory || K. Korlević, M. Jurić || — || align=right | 2.6 km || 
|-id=504 bgcolor=#fefefe
| 168504 ||  || — || October 12, 1999 || Ondřejov || P. Kušnirák, P. Pravec || MAS || align=right data-sort-value="0.91" | 910 m || 
|-id=505 bgcolor=#fefefe
| 168505 ||  || — || October 13, 1999 || Anderson Mesa || LONEOS || — || align=right | 1.8 km || 
|-id=506 bgcolor=#fefefe
| 168506 ||  || — || October 4, 1999 || Kitt Peak || Spacewatch || MAS || align=right data-sort-value="0.92" | 920 m || 
|-id=507 bgcolor=#fefefe
| 168507 ||  || — || October 8, 1999 || Kitt Peak || Spacewatch || MAS || align=right data-sort-value="0.94" | 940 m || 
|-id=508 bgcolor=#E9E9E9
| 168508 ||  || — || October 9, 1999 || Kitt Peak || Spacewatch || — || align=right | 1.4 km || 
|-id=509 bgcolor=#E9E9E9
| 168509 ||  || — || October 9, 1999 || Kitt Peak || Spacewatch || — || align=right | 3.3 km || 
|-id=510 bgcolor=#fefefe
| 168510 ||  || — || October 12, 1999 || Kitt Peak || Spacewatch || — || align=right | 1.4 km || 
|-id=511 bgcolor=#fefefe
| 168511 ||  || — || October 2, 1999 || Socorro || LINEAR || — || align=right | 2.0 km || 
|-id=512 bgcolor=#fefefe
| 168512 ||  || — || October 3, 1999 || Socorro || LINEAR || — || align=right | 1.9 km || 
|-id=513 bgcolor=#fefefe
| 168513 ||  || — || October 6, 1999 || Socorro || LINEAR || NYS || align=right | 1.00 km || 
|-id=514 bgcolor=#E9E9E9
| 168514 ||  || — || October 6, 1999 || Socorro || LINEAR || KON || align=right | 2.9 km || 
|-id=515 bgcolor=#fefefe
| 168515 ||  || — || October 7, 1999 || Socorro || LINEAR || — || align=right | 1.2 km || 
|-id=516 bgcolor=#fefefe
| 168516 ||  || — || October 9, 1999 || Socorro || LINEAR || — || align=right | 3.4 km || 
|-id=517 bgcolor=#d6d6d6
| 168517 ||  || — || October 10, 1999 || Socorro || LINEAR || 3:2 || align=right | 9.0 km || 
|-id=518 bgcolor=#fefefe
| 168518 ||  || — || October 10, 1999 || Socorro || LINEAR || — || align=right | 1.3 km || 
|-id=519 bgcolor=#fefefe
| 168519 ||  || — || October 12, 1999 || Socorro || LINEAR || V || align=right | 1.3 km || 
|-id=520 bgcolor=#d6d6d6
| 168520 ||  || — || October 3, 1999 || Socorro || LINEAR || 3:2 || align=right | 5.6 km || 
|-id=521 bgcolor=#E9E9E9
| 168521 ||  || — || October 3, 1999 || Catalina || CSS || — || align=right | 1.5 km || 
|-id=522 bgcolor=#E9E9E9
| 168522 ||  || — || October 4, 1999 || Catalina || CSS || — || align=right | 1.4 km || 
|-id=523 bgcolor=#fefefe
| 168523 ||  || — || October 4, 1999 || Catalina || CSS || — || align=right | 1.8 km || 
|-id=524 bgcolor=#fefefe
| 168524 ||  || — || October 10, 1999 || Kitt Peak || Spacewatch || NYS || align=right | 1.0 km || 
|-id=525 bgcolor=#d6d6d6
| 168525 ||  || — || October 9, 1999 || Socorro || LINEAR || SHU3:2 || align=right | 9.4 km || 
|-id=526 bgcolor=#E9E9E9
| 168526 ||  || — || October 7, 1999 || Socorro || LINEAR || — || align=right | 1.3 km || 
|-id=527 bgcolor=#E9E9E9
| 168527 ||  || — || October 12, 1999 || Kitt Peak || Spacewatch || — || align=right data-sort-value="0.91" | 910 m || 
|-id=528 bgcolor=#fefefe
| 168528 ||  || — || October 29, 1999 || Catalina || CSS || NYS || align=right | 1.5 km || 
|-id=529 bgcolor=#E9E9E9
| 168529 ||  || — || October 31, 1999 || Kitt Peak || Spacewatch || — || align=right | 1.5 km || 
|-id=530 bgcolor=#d6d6d6
| 168530 ||  || — || October 31, 1999 || Kitt Peak || Spacewatch || 3:2 || align=right | 6.9 km || 
|-id=531 bgcolor=#fefefe
| 168531 Joshuakammer ||  ||  || November 10, 1999 || Kitt Peak || M. W. Buie || H || align=right | 1.1 km || 
|-id=532 bgcolor=#E9E9E9
| 168532 ||  || — || November 12, 1999 || Višnjan Observatory || K. Korlević || — || align=right | 1.7 km || 
|-id=533 bgcolor=#E9E9E9
| 168533 ||  || — || November 10, 1999 || Socorro || LINEAR || — || align=right | 1.4 km || 
|-id=534 bgcolor=#fefefe
| 168534 ||  || — || November 4, 1999 || Catalina || CSS || V || align=right | 1.5 km || 
|-id=535 bgcolor=#E9E9E9
| 168535 ||  || — || November 4, 1999 || Socorro || LINEAR || — || align=right | 1.5 km || 
|-id=536 bgcolor=#fefefe
| 168536 ||  || — || November 4, 1999 || Socorro || LINEAR || — || align=right | 1.6 km || 
|-id=537 bgcolor=#fefefe
| 168537 ||  || — || November 4, 1999 || Socorro || LINEAR || — || align=right | 1.4 km || 
|-id=538 bgcolor=#fefefe
| 168538 ||  || — || November 6, 1999 || Kitt Peak || Spacewatch || NYS || align=right | 1.1 km || 
|-id=539 bgcolor=#fefefe
| 168539 ||  || — || November 4, 1999 || Socorro || LINEAR || — || align=right | 1.2 km || 
|-id=540 bgcolor=#E9E9E9
| 168540 ||  || — || November 9, 1999 || Socorro || LINEAR || — || align=right | 3.0 km || 
|-id=541 bgcolor=#E9E9E9
| 168541 ||  || — || November 9, 1999 || Socorro || LINEAR || — || align=right data-sort-value="0.96" | 960 m || 
|-id=542 bgcolor=#E9E9E9
| 168542 ||  || — || November 5, 1999 || Kitt Peak || Spacewatch || PAD || align=right | 3.8 km || 
|-id=543 bgcolor=#fefefe
| 168543 ||  || — || November 9, 1999 || Kitt Peak || Spacewatch || — || align=right | 1.3 km || 
|-id=544 bgcolor=#E9E9E9
| 168544 ||  || — || November 14, 1999 || Socorro || LINEAR || — || align=right | 1.8 km || 
|-id=545 bgcolor=#d6d6d6
| 168545 ||  || — || November 14, 1999 || Socorro || LINEAR || 3:2 || align=right | 7.4 km || 
|-id=546 bgcolor=#fefefe
| 168546 ||  || — || November 15, 1999 || Socorro || LINEAR || NYS || align=right | 1.5 km || 
|-id=547 bgcolor=#E9E9E9
| 168547 ||  || — || November 12, 1999 || Socorro || LINEAR || — || align=right | 1.1 km || 
|-id=548 bgcolor=#fefefe
| 168548 ||  || — || November 1, 1999 || Socorro || LINEAR || H || align=right | 1.0 km || 
|-id=549 bgcolor=#E9E9E9
| 168549 ||  || — || November 11, 1999 || Catalina || CSS || — || align=right | 2.0 km || 
|-id=550 bgcolor=#d6d6d6
| 168550 ||  || — || November 12, 1999 || Socorro || LINEAR || HIL3:2 || align=right | 8.7 km || 
|-id=551 bgcolor=#fefefe
| 168551 ||  || — || November 28, 1999 || Chiyoda || T. Kojima || MAS || align=right | 1.3 km || 
|-id=552 bgcolor=#FA8072
| 168552 ||  || — || November 29, 1999 || Višnjan Observatory || K. Korlević || H || align=right | 1.6 km || 
|-id=553 bgcolor=#fefefe
| 168553 ||  || — || November 29, 1999 || Črni Vrh || Črni Vrh || — || align=right | 3.9 km || 
|-id=554 bgcolor=#FA8072
| 168554 ||  || — || November 30, 1999 || Črni Vrh || Črni Vrh || — || align=right | 2.9 km || 
|-id=555 bgcolor=#fefefe
| 168555 ||  || — || November 30, 1999 || Kitt Peak || Spacewatch || MAS || align=right | 1.2 km || 
|-id=556 bgcolor=#E9E9E9
| 168556 ||  || — || November 28, 1999 || Kitt Peak || Spacewatch || — || align=right | 2.4 km || 
|-id=557 bgcolor=#d6d6d6
| 168557 ||  || — || December 4, 1999 || Catalina || CSS || SHU3:2 || align=right | 12 km || 
|-id=558 bgcolor=#fefefe
| 168558 ||  || — || December 7, 1999 || Socorro || LINEAR || H || align=right | 1.6 km || 
|-id=559 bgcolor=#fefefe
| 168559 ||  || — || December 6, 1999 || Socorro || LINEAR || — || align=right | 3.6 km || 
|-id=560 bgcolor=#E9E9E9
| 168560 ||  || — || December 6, 1999 || Socorro || LINEAR || — || align=right | 1.4 km || 
|-id=561 bgcolor=#fefefe
| 168561 ||  || — || December 6, 1999 || Socorro || LINEAR || — || align=right | 1.8 km || 
|-id=562 bgcolor=#E9E9E9
| 168562 ||  || — || December 6, 1999 || Socorro || LINEAR || — || align=right | 5.1 km || 
|-id=563 bgcolor=#E9E9E9
| 168563 ||  || — || December 7, 1999 || Socorro || LINEAR || MIT || align=right | 4.6 km || 
|-id=564 bgcolor=#E9E9E9
| 168564 ||  || — || December 7, 1999 || Socorro || LINEAR || EUN || align=right | 2.5 km || 
|-id=565 bgcolor=#E9E9E9
| 168565 ||  || — || December 7, 1999 || Socorro || LINEAR || JUN || align=right | 2.0 km || 
|-id=566 bgcolor=#E9E9E9
| 168566 ||  || — || December 7, 1999 || Socorro || LINEAR || — || align=right | 3.9 km || 
|-id=567 bgcolor=#E9E9E9
| 168567 ||  || — || December 7, 1999 || Socorro || LINEAR || — || align=right | 2.8 km || 
|-id=568 bgcolor=#fefefe
| 168568 ||  || — || December 5, 1999 || Catalina || CSS || — || align=right | 2.0 km || 
|-id=569 bgcolor=#E9E9E9
| 168569 ||  || — || December 12, 1999 || Socorro || LINEAR || EUN || align=right | 2.3 km || 
|-id=570 bgcolor=#E9E9E9
| 168570 ||  || — || December 12, 1999 || Socorro || LINEAR || RAF || align=right | 2.1 km || 
|-id=571 bgcolor=#FA8072
| 168571 ||  || — || December 13, 1999 || Socorro || LINEAR || H || align=right | 1.4 km || 
|-id=572 bgcolor=#fefefe
| 168572 ||  || — || December 10, 1999 || Socorro || LINEAR || H || align=right | 1.8 km || 
|-id=573 bgcolor=#fefefe
| 168573 ||  || — || December 12, 1999 || Socorro || LINEAR || H || align=right | 1.6 km || 
|-id=574 bgcolor=#E9E9E9
| 168574 ||  || — || December 12, 1999 || Socorro || LINEAR || — || align=right | 2.0 km || 
|-id=575 bgcolor=#fefefe
| 168575 ||  || — || December 12, 1999 || Socorro || LINEAR || H || align=right | 1.1 km || 
|-id=576 bgcolor=#fefefe
| 168576 ||  || — || December 12, 1999 || Socorro || LINEAR || H || align=right | 1.2 km || 
|-id=577 bgcolor=#E9E9E9
| 168577 ||  || — || December 12, 1999 || Socorro || LINEAR || BAR || align=right | 1.7 km || 
|-id=578 bgcolor=#E9E9E9
| 168578 ||  || — || December 10, 1999 || Socorro || LINEAR || ADE || align=right | 3.5 km || 
|-id=579 bgcolor=#E9E9E9
| 168579 ||  || — || December 12, 1999 || Socorro || LINEAR || EUN || align=right | 2.2 km || 
|-id=580 bgcolor=#E9E9E9
| 168580 ||  || — || December 13, 1999 || Socorro || LINEAR || — || align=right | 2.1 km || 
|-id=581 bgcolor=#E9E9E9
| 168581 ||  || — || December 13, 1999 || Kitt Peak || Spacewatch || — || align=right | 2.2 km || 
|-id=582 bgcolor=#E9E9E9
| 168582 ||  || — || December 14, 1999 || Kitt Peak || Spacewatch || — || align=right | 1.6 km || 
|-id=583 bgcolor=#fefefe
| 168583 ||  || — || December 7, 1999 || Catalina || CSS || H || align=right | 1.3 km || 
|-id=584 bgcolor=#E9E9E9
| 168584 ||  || — || December 3, 1999 || Socorro || LINEAR || — || align=right | 1.5 km || 
|-id=585 bgcolor=#E9E9E9
| 168585 ||  || — || December 4, 1999 || Kitt Peak || Spacewatch || — || align=right | 1.8 km || 
|-id=586 bgcolor=#fefefe
| 168586 ||  || — || December 17, 1999 || Socorro || LINEAR || H || align=right data-sort-value="0.82" | 820 m || 
|-id=587 bgcolor=#fefefe
| 168587 ||  || — || December 30, 1999 || Socorro || LINEAR || H || align=right | 1.4 km || 
|-id=588 bgcolor=#E9E9E9
| 168588 ||  || — || December 29, 1999 || Mauna Kea || C. Veillet || — || align=right | 1.9 km || 
|-id=589 bgcolor=#E9E9E9
| 168589 ||  || — || December 30, 1999 || Socorro || LINEAR || — || align=right | 2.8 km || 
|-id=590 bgcolor=#E9E9E9
| 168590 ||  || — || January 2, 2000 || Socorro || LINEAR || — || align=right | 1.5 km || 
|-id=591 bgcolor=#E9E9E9
| 168591 ||  || — || January 3, 2000 || Socorro || LINEAR || — || align=right | 3.6 km || 
|-id=592 bgcolor=#E9E9E9
| 168592 ||  || — || January 3, 2000 || Socorro || LINEAR || — || align=right | 1.7 km || 
|-id=593 bgcolor=#E9E9E9
| 168593 ||  || — || January 3, 2000 || Socorro || LINEAR || — || align=right | 1.8 km || 
|-id=594 bgcolor=#E9E9E9
| 168594 ||  || — || January 3, 2000 || Socorro || LINEAR || JUN || align=right | 1.8 km || 
|-id=595 bgcolor=#E9E9E9
| 168595 ||  || — || January 3, 2000 || Socorro || LINEAR || — || align=right | 2.8 km || 
|-id=596 bgcolor=#E9E9E9
| 168596 ||  || — || January 4, 2000 || Socorro || LINEAR || — || align=right | 3.4 km || 
|-id=597 bgcolor=#E9E9E9
| 168597 ||  || — || January 4, 2000 || Socorro || LINEAR || — || align=right | 2.1 km || 
|-id=598 bgcolor=#fefefe
| 168598 ||  || — || January 5, 2000 || Socorro || LINEAR || H || align=right | 1.1 km || 
|-id=599 bgcolor=#E9E9E9
| 168599 ||  || — || January 4, 2000 || Socorro || LINEAR || — || align=right | 2.5 km || 
|-id=600 bgcolor=#fefefe
| 168600 ||  || — || January 5, 2000 || Socorro || LINEAR || — || align=right | 2.8 km || 
|}

168601–168700 

|-bgcolor=#fefefe
| 168601 ||  || — || January 5, 2000 || Socorro || LINEAR || — || align=right | 2.0 km || 
|-id=602 bgcolor=#E9E9E9
| 168602 ||  || — || January 5, 2000 || Socorro || LINEAR || — || align=right | 3.3 km || 
|-id=603 bgcolor=#FA8072
| 168603 ||  || — || January 5, 2000 || Socorro || LINEAR || H || align=right | 1.6 km || 
|-id=604 bgcolor=#E9E9E9
| 168604 ||  || — || January 3, 2000 || Socorro || LINEAR || — || align=right | 3.9 km || 
|-id=605 bgcolor=#E9E9E9
| 168605 ||  || — || January 4, 2000 || Socorro || LINEAR || EUN || align=right | 2.7 km || 
|-id=606 bgcolor=#E9E9E9
| 168606 ||  || — || January 3, 2000 || Socorro || LINEAR || — || align=right | 2.4 km || 
|-id=607 bgcolor=#E9E9E9
| 168607 ||  || — || January 8, 2000 || Socorro || LINEAR || MAR || align=right | 2.0 km || 
|-id=608 bgcolor=#E9E9E9
| 168608 ||  || — || January 7, 2000 || Socorro || LINEAR || — || align=right | 1.9 km || 
|-id=609 bgcolor=#E9E9E9
| 168609 ||  || — || January 7, 2000 || Socorro || LINEAR || — || align=right | 2.4 km || 
|-id=610 bgcolor=#E9E9E9
| 168610 ||  || — || January 8, 2000 || Socorro || LINEAR || — || align=right | 4.4 km || 
|-id=611 bgcolor=#E9E9E9
| 168611 ||  || — || January 6, 2000 || Kitt Peak || Spacewatch || — || align=right | 2.9 km || 
|-id=612 bgcolor=#E9E9E9
| 168612 ||  || — || January 3, 2000 || Kitt Peak || Spacewatch || — || align=right | 2.5 km || 
|-id=613 bgcolor=#fefefe
| 168613 ||  || — || January 7, 2000 || Mauna Kea || D. J. Tholen, R. J. Whiteley || NYS || align=right | 2.5 km || 
|-id=614 bgcolor=#fefefe
| 168614 ||  || — || January 27, 2000 || Socorro || LINEAR || LCI || align=right | 1.7 km || 
|-id=615 bgcolor=#E9E9E9
| 168615 ||  || — || January 28, 2000 || Kitt Peak || Spacewatch || — || align=right | 2.4 km || 
|-id=616 bgcolor=#E9E9E9
| 168616 ||  || — || January 29, 2000 || Kitt Peak || Spacewatch || GEF || align=right | 2.1 km || 
|-id=617 bgcolor=#E9E9E9
| 168617 ||  || — || January 30, 2000 || Socorro || LINEAR || — || align=right | 2.1 km || 
|-id=618 bgcolor=#E9E9E9
| 168618 ||  || — || January 30, 2000 || Socorro || LINEAR || — || align=right | 3.4 km || 
|-id=619 bgcolor=#E9E9E9
| 168619 ||  || — || January 27, 2000 || Kitt Peak || Spacewatch || PAD || align=right | 3.9 km || 
|-id=620 bgcolor=#E9E9E9
| 168620 ||  || — || January 30, 2000 || Kitt Peak || Spacewatch || HEN || align=right | 3.1 km || 
|-id=621 bgcolor=#E9E9E9
| 168621 ||  || — || February 2, 2000 || Oizumi || T. Kobayashi || — || align=right | 2.1 km || 
|-id=622 bgcolor=#E9E9E9
| 168622 ||  || — || February 2, 2000 || Socorro || LINEAR || — || align=right | 2.5 km || 
|-id=623 bgcolor=#E9E9E9
| 168623 ||  || — || February 2, 2000 || Socorro || LINEAR || — || align=right | 2.5 km || 
|-id=624 bgcolor=#E9E9E9
| 168624 ||  || — || February 2, 2000 || Socorro || LINEAR || — || align=right | 2.3 km || 
|-id=625 bgcolor=#E9E9E9
| 168625 ||  || — || February 2, 2000 || Socorro || LINEAR || — || align=right | 1.7 km || 
|-id=626 bgcolor=#E9E9E9
| 168626 ||  || — || February 3, 2000 || Socorro || LINEAR || MIS || align=right | 3.4 km || 
|-id=627 bgcolor=#d6d6d6
| 168627 ||  || — || February 4, 2000 || Socorro || LINEAR || — || align=right | 4.9 km || 
|-id=628 bgcolor=#E9E9E9
| 168628 ||  || — || February 6, 2000 || Socorro || LINEAR || — || align=right | 3.7 km || 
|-id=629 bgcolor=#E9E9E9
| 168629 ||  || — || February 1, 2000 || Kitt Peak || Spacewatch || — || align=right | 4.2 km || 
|-id=630 bgcolor=#E9E9E9
| 168630 ||  || — || February 4, 2000 || Socorro || LINEAR || — || align=right | 2.9 km || 
|-id=631 bgcolor=#E9E9E9
| 168631 ||  || — || February 4, 2000 || Socorro || LINEAR || — || align=right | 3.1 km || 
|-id=632 bgcolor=#E9E9E9
| 168632 ||  || — || February 4, 2000 || Socorro || LINEAR || MIS || align=right | 3.4 km || 
|-id=633 bgcolor=#E9E9E9
| 168633 ||  || — || February 12, 2000 || Kitt Peak || Spacewatch || — || align=right | 2.4 km || 
|-id=634 bgcolor=#E9E9E9
| 168634 ||  || — || February 15, 2000 || Oaxaca || J. M. Roe || — || align=right | 3.9 km || 
|-id=635 bgcolor=#E9E9E9
| 168635 Davidkaufmann ||  ||  || February 5, 2000 || Kitt Peak || M. W. Buie || — || align=right | 2.3 km || 
|-id=636 bgcolor=#E9E9E9
| 168636 ||  || — || February 2, 2000 || Kitt Peak || Spacewatch || — || align=right | 2.9 km || 
|-id=637 bgcolor=#E9E9E9
| 168637 ||  || — || February 4, 2000 || Kitt Peak || Spacewatch || — || align=right | 2.2 km || 
|-id=638 bgcolor=#E9E9E9
| 168638 Waltersiegmund ||  ||  || February 12, 2000 || Apache Point || SDSS || — || align=right | 2.9 km || 
|-id=639 bgcolor=#E9E9E9
| 168639 ||  || — || February 26, 2000 || Kitt Peak || Spacewatch || — || align=right | 3.8 km || 
|-id=640 bgcolor=#E9E9E9
| 168640 ||  || — || February 26, 2000 || Kitt Peak || Spacewatch || HEN || align=right | 1.4 km || 
|-id=641 bgcolor=#E9E9E9
| 168641 ||  || — || February 26, 2000 || Kitt Peak || Spacewatch || — || align=right | 2.5 km || 
|-id=642 bgcolor=#E9E9E9
| 168642 ||  || — || February 29, 2000 || Socorro || LINEAR || — || align=right | 3.5 km || 
|-id=643 bgcolor=#E9E9E9
| 168643 ||  || — || February 29, 2000 || Socorro || LINEAR || — || align=right | 4.1 km || 
|-id=644 bgcolor=#E9E9E9
| 168644 ||  || — || February 29, 2000 || Socorro || LINEAR || — || align=right | 3.3 km || 
|-id=645 bgcolor=#E9E9E9
| 168645 ||  || — || February 29, 2000 || Socorro || LINEAR || HEN || align=right | 1.5 km || 
|-id=646 bgcolor=#E9E9E9
| 168646 ||  || — || February 29, 2000 || Socorro || LINEAR || WIT || align=right | 2.0 km || 
|-id=647 bgcolor=#E9E9E9
| 168647 ||  || — || February 29, 2000 || Socorro || LINEAR || — || align=right | 4.3 km || 
|-id=648 bgcolor=#E9E9E9
| 168648 ||  || — || February 29, 2000 || Socorro || LINEAR || — || align=right | 1.8 km || 
|-id=649 bgcolor=#d6d6d6
| 168649 ||  || — || February 29, 2000 || Socorro || LINEAR || EOS || align=right | 2.8 km || 
|-id=650 bgcolor=#E9E9E9
| 168650 ||  || — || February 29, 2000 || Socorro || LINEAR || AGN || align=right | 2.2 km || 
|-id=651 bgcolor=#E9E9E9
| 168651 ||  || — || February 29, 2000 || Socorro || LINEAR || — || align=right | 2.5 km || 
|-id=652 bgcolor=#E9E9E9
| 168652 ||  || — || February 29, 2000 || Socorro || LINEAR || — || align=right | 4.3 km || 
|-id=653 bgcolor=#E9E9E9
| 168653 ||  || — || February 28, 2000 || Socorro || LINEAR || — || align=right | 2.5 km || 
|-id=654 bgcolor=#E9E9E9
| 168654 ||  || — || February 28, 2000 || Socorro || LINEAR || DOR || align=right | 3.5 km || 
|-id=655 bgcolor=#E9E9E9
| 168655 ||  || — || February 29, 2000 || Socorro || LINEAR || — || align=right | 3.4 km || 
|-id=656 bgcolor=#E9E9E9
| 168656 ||  || — || February 29, 2000 || Socorro || LINEAR || MRX || align=right | 2.1 km || 
|-id=657 bgcolor=#E9E9E9
| 168657 ||  || — || March 3, 2000 || Socorro || LINEAR || — || align=right | 1.4 km || 
|-id=658 bgcolor=#E9E9E9
| 168658 ||  || — || March 5, 2000 || Socorro || LINEAR || PAE || align=right | 3.9 km || 
|-id=659 bgcolor=#E9E9E9
| 168659 ||  || — || March 3, 2000 || Kitt Peak || Spacewatch || MRX || align=right | 1.6 km || 
|-id=660 bgcolor=#E9E9E9
| 168660 ||  || — || March 5, 2000 || Socorro || LINEAR || — || align=right | 2.5 km || 
|-id=661 bgcolor=#E9E9E9
| 168661 ||  || — || March 3, 2000 || Kitt Peak || Spacewatch || — || align=right | 3.6 km || 
|-id=662 bgcolor=#E9E9E9
| 168662 ||  || — || March 9, 2000 || Socorro || LINEAR || GEF || align=right | 2.3 km || 
|-id=663 bgcolor=#E9E9E9
| 168663 ||  || — || March 15, 2000 || Socorro || LINEAR || — || align=right | 4.3 km || 
|-id=664 bgcolor=#E9E9E9
| 168664 ||  || — || March 8, 2000 || Haleakala || NEAT || — || align=right | 2.5 km || 
|-id=665 bgcolor=#E9E9E9
| 168665 ||  || — || March 9, 2000 || Haleakala || NEAT || — || align=right | 1.9 km || 
|-id=666 bgcolor=#E9E9E9
| 168666 ||  || — || March 11, 2000 || Anderson Mesa || LONEOS || — || align=right | 3.9 km || 
|-id=667 bgcolor=#E9E9E9
| 168667 ||  || — || March 2, 2000 || Kitt Peak || Spacewatch || — || align=right | 2.8 km || 
|-id=668 bgcolor=#E9E9E9
| 168668 ||  || — || March 5, 2000 || Socorro || LINEAR || NEM || align=right | 4.1 km || 
|-id=669 bgcolor=#d6d6d6
| 168669 ||  || — || March 6, 2000 || Haleakala || NEAT || — || align=right | 4.4 km || 
|-id=670 bgcolor=#E9E9E9
| 168670 ||  || — || March 3, 2000 || Socorro || LINEAR || — || align=right | 3.2 km || 
|-id=671 bgcolor=#d6d6d6
| 168671 ||  || — || March 3, 2000 || Kitt Peak || Spacewatch || KOR || align=right | 1.7 km || 
|-id=672 bgcolor=#E9E9E9
| 168672 ||  || — || March 4, 2000 || Socorro || LINEAR || GEF || align=right | 2.0 km || 
|-id=673 bgcolor=#E9E9E9
| 168673 ||  || — || March 2, 2000 || Kitt Peak || Spacewatch || HEN || align=right | 1.7 km || 
|-id=674 bgcolor=#E9E9E9
| 168674 || 2000 FC || — || March 24, 2000 || Prescott || P. G. Comba || — || align=right | 2.1 km || 
|-id=675 bgcolor=#d6d6d6
| 168675 ||  || — || March 25, 2000 || Kitt Peak || Spacewatch || THM || align=right | 3.4 km || 
|-id=676 bgcolor=#E9E9E9
| 168676 ||  || — || March 28, 2000 || Socorro || LINEAR || — || align=right | 4.3 km || 
|-id=677 bgcolor=#E9E9E9
| 168677 ||  || — || March 27, 2000 || Kitt Peak || Spacewatch || HOF || align=right | 3.7 km || 
|-id=678 bgcolor=#E9E9E9
| 168678 ||  || — || March 27, 2000 || Kitt Peak || Spacewatch || PAD || align=right | 3.0 km || 
|-id=679 bgcolor=#E9E9E9
| 168679 ||  || — || March 27, 2000 || Socorro || LINEAR || — || align=right | 7.2 km || 
|-id=680 bgcolor=#E9E9E9
| 168680 ||  || — || March 28, 2000 || Socorro || LINEAR || — || align=right | 2.2 km || 
|-id=681 bgcolor=#E9E9E9
| 168681 ||  || — || March 29, 2000 || Socorro || LINEAR || — || align=right | 4.2 km || 
|-id=682 bgcolor=#d6d6d6
| 168682 ||  || — || March 30, 2000 || Kitt Peak || Spacewatch || KOR || align=right | 2.1 km || 
|-id=683 bgcolor=#E9E9E9
| 168683 ||  || — || March 27, 2000 || Kitt Peak || Spacewatch || — || align=right | 3.6 km || 
|-id=684 bgcolor=#E9E9E9
| 168684 ||  || — || March 25, 2000 || Kitt Peak || Spacewatch || — || align=right | 5.1 km || 
|-id=685 bgcolor=#d6d6d6
| 168685 ||  || — || April 5, 2000 || Socorro || LINEAR || THB || align=right | 7.0 km || 
|-id=686 bgcolor=#E9E9E9
| 168686 ||  || — || April 5, 2000 || Socorro || LINEAR || HOF || align=right | 4.0 km || 
|-id=687 bgcolor=#E9E9E9
| 168687 ||  || — || April 5, 2000 || Socorro || LINEAR || — || align=right | 2.2 km || 
|-id=688 bgcolor=#E9E9E9
| 168688 ||  || — || April 5, 2000 || Socorro || LINEAR || — || align=right | 4.4 km || 
|-id=689 bgcolor=#E9E9E9
| 168689 ||  || — || April 5, 2000 || Socorro || LINEAR || HEN || align=right | 2.0 km || 
|-id=690 bgcolor=#d6d6d6
| 168690 ||  || — || April 5, 2000 || Socorro || LINEAR || — || align=right | 4.3 km || 
|-id=691 bgcolor=#d6d6d6
| 168691 ||  || — || April 5, 2000 || Socorro || LINEAR || — || align=right | 5.5 km || 
|-id=692 bgcolor=#E9E9E9
| 168692 ||  || — || April 5, 2000 || Socorro || LINEAR || 526 || align=right | 4.6 km || 
|-id=693 bgcolor=#E9E9E9
| 168693 ||  || — || April 5, 2000 || Socorro || LINEAR || — || align=right | 4.2 km || 
|-id=694 bgcolor=#d6d6d6
| 168694 ||  || — || April 5, 2000 || Socorro || LINEAR || — || align=right | 4.7 km || 
|-id=695 bgcolor=#E9E9E9
| 168695 ||  || — || April 3, 2000 || Kitt Peak || Spacewatch || NEM || align=right | 2.9 km || 
|-id=696 bgcolor=#d6d6d6
| 168696 ||  || — || April 5, 2000 || Kitt Peak || Spacewatch || KOR || align=right | 1.7 km || 
|-id=697 bgcolor=#d6d6d6
| 168697 ||  || — || April 6, 2000 || Bergisch Gladbach || W. Bickel || — || align=right | 4.8 km || 
|-id=698 bgcolor=#E9E9E9
| 168698 Robpickman ||  ||  || April 5, 2000 || Anderson Mesa || L. H. Wasserman || MRX || align=right | 1.6 km || 
|-id=699 bgcolor=#fefefe
| 168699 ||  || — || April 7, 2000 || Kitt Peak || Spacewatch || — || align=right data-sort-value="0.90" | 900 m || 
|-id=700 bgcolor=#C2E0FF
| 168700 ||  || — || April 2, 2000 || Mauna Kea || D. C. Jewitt, C. Trujillo, S. S. Sheppard || plutino || align=right | 97 km || 
|}

168701–168800 

|-bgcolor=#d6d6d6
| 168701 ||  || — || April 7, 2000 || Socorro || LINEAR || — || align=right | 4.3 km || 
|-id=702 bgcolor=#E9E9E9
| 168702 ||  || — || April 5, 2000 || Anderson Mesa || LONEOS || — || align=right | 1.9 km || 
|-id=703 bgcolor=#C2E0FF
| 168703 ||  || — || April 2, 2000 || Mauna Kea || Mauna Kea Obs. || other TNO || align=right | 271 km || 
|-id=704 bgcolor=#d6d6d6
| 168704 ||  || — || April 3, 2000 || Kitt Peak || Spacewatch || THM || align=right | 3.9 km || 
|-id=705 bgcolor=#E9E9E9
| 168705 || 2000 HN || — || April 24, 2000 || Kitt Peak || Spacewatch || — || align=right | 3.3 km || 
|-id=706 bgcolor=#d6d6d6
| 168706 ||  || — || April 24, 2000 || Kitt Peak || Spacewatch || THM || align=right | 3.0 km || 
|-id=707 bgcolor=#d6d6d6
| 168707 ||  || — || April 24, 2000 || Kitt Peak || Spacewatch || — || align=right | 4.4 km || 
|-id=708 bgcolor=#E9E9E9
| 168708 ||  || — || April 27, 2000 || Socorro || LINEAR || — || align=right | 5.5 km || 
|-id=709 bgcolor=#E9E9E9
| 168709 ||  || — || April 25, 2000 || Anderson Mesa || LONEOS || GEF || align=right | 2.2 km || 
|-id=710 bgcolor=#FA8072
| 168710 ||  || — || April 28, 2000 || Socorro || LINEAR || — || align=right | 1.7 km || 
|-id=711 bgcolor=#E9E9E9
| 168711 ||  || — || April 30, 2000 || Haleakala || NEAT || — || align=right | 3.5 km || 
|-id=712 bgcolor=#E9E9E9
| 168712 ||  || — || April 28, 2000 || Anderson Mesa || LONEOS || GAL || align=right | 2.9 km || 
|-id=713 bgcolor=#FA8072
| 168713 ||  || — || April 30, 2000 || Anderson Mesa || LONEOS || — || align=right | 1.1 km || 
|-id=714 bgcolor=#FA8072
| 168714 ||  || — || May 7, 2000 || Socorro || LINEAR || — || align=right | 1.2 km || 
|-id=715 bgcolor=#d6d6d6
| 168715 ||  || — || May 5, 2000 || Socorro || LINEAR || — || align=right | 4.3 km || 
|-id=716 bgcolor=#d6d6d6
| 168716 ||  || — || May 7, 2000 || Socorro || LINEAR || TIR || align=right | 4.2 km || 
|-id=717 bgcolor=#E9E9E9
| 168717 ||  || — || May 7, 2000 || Socorro || LINEAR || — || align=right | 3.8 km || 
|-id=718 bgcolor=#E9E9E9
| 168718 ||  || — || May 2, 2000 || Anderson Mesa || LONEOS || — || align=right | 3.7 km || 
|-id=719 bgcolor=#d6d6d6
| 168719 ||  || — || May 27, 2000 || Socorro || LINEAR || — || align=right | 5.3 km || 
|-id=720 bgcolor=#d6d6d6
| 168720 ||  || — || May 28, 2000 || Socorro || LINEAR || — || align=right | 4.6 km || 
|-id=721 bgcolor=#d6d6d6
| 168721 ||  || — || May 29, 2000 || Kitt Peak || Spacewatch || — || align=right | 4.4 km || 
|-id=722 bgcolor=#d6d6d6
| 168722 || 2000 LH || — || June 1, 2000 || Prescott || P. G. Comba || — || align=right | 4.3 km || 
|-id=723 bgcolor=#fefefe
| 168723 ||  || — || July 31, 2000 || Črni Vrh || Črni Vrh || FLO || align=right data-sort-value="0.97" | 970 m || 
|-id=724 bgcolor=#d6d6d6
| 168724 ||  || — || July 23, 2000 || Socorro || LINEAR || MEL || align=right | 7.4 km || 
|-id=725 bgcolor=#fefefe
| 168725 ||  || — || July 23, 2000 || Socorro || LINEAR || FLO || align=right | 1.3 km || 
|-id=726 bgcolor=#fefefe
| 168726 ||  || — || July 30, 2000 || Socorro || LINEAR || — || align=right | 1.5 km || 
|-id=727 bgcolor=#fefefe
| 168727 ||  || — || July 30, 2000 || Socorro || LINEAR || FLO || align=right | 1.0 km || 
|-id=728 bgcolor=#FA8072
| 168728 ||  || — || July 30, 2000 || Socorro || LINEAR || — || align=right | 1.2 km || 
|-id=729 bgcolor=#fefefe
| 168729 ||  || — || July 30, 2000 || Socorro || LINEAR || — || align=right data-sort-value="0.97" | 970 m || 
|-id=730 bgcolor=#FA8072
| 168730 ||  || — || July 30, 2000 || Socorro || LINEAR || — || align=right | 1.2 km || 
|-id=731 bgcolor=#fefefe
| 168731 ||  || — || July 29, 2000 || Anderson Mesa || LONEOS || — || align=right | 1.2 km || 
|-id=732 bgcolor=#fefefe
| 168732 ||  || — || July 29, 2000 || Anderson Mesa || LONEOS || — || align=right | 1.0 km || 
|-id=733 bgcolor=#fefefe
| 168733 ||  || — || August 1, 2000 || Socorro || LINEAR || KLI || align=right | 2.8 km || 
|-id=734 bgcolor=#fefefe
| 168734 ||  || — || August 4, 2000 || Haleakala || NEAT || FLO || align=right | 1.0 km || 
|-id=735 bgcolor=#fefefe
| 168735 ||  || — || August 25, 2000 || Farra d'Isonzo || Farra d'Isonzo || — || align=right | 1.2 km || 
|-id=736 bgcolor=#fefefe
| 168736 ||  || — || August 24, 2000 || Socorro || LINEAR || FLO || align=right | 1.2 km || 
|-id=737 bgcolor=#fefefe
| 168737 ||  || — || August 26, 2000 || Socorro || LINEAR || — || align=right | 1.5 km || 
|-id=738 bgcolor=#fefefe
| 168738 ||  || — || August 24, 2000 || Socorro || LINEAR || — || align=right | 1.4 km || 
|-id=739 bgcolor=#fefefe
| 168739 ||  || — || August 26, 2000 || Socorro || LINEAR || FLO || align=right | 1.4 km || 
|-id=740 bgcolor=#fefefe
| 168740 ||  || — || August 24, 2000 || Socorro || LINEAR || — || align=right | 1.5 km || 
|-id=741 bgcolor=#fefefe
| 168741 ||  || — || August 25, 2000 || Socorro || LINEAR || — || align=right | 1.3 km || 
|-id=742 bgcolor=#fefefe
| 168742 ||  || — || August 25, 2000 || Socorro || LINEAR || V || align=right | 1.1 km || 
|-id=743 bgcolor=#fefefe
| 168743 ||  || — || August 28, 2000 || Socorro || LINEAR || FLO || align=right | 1.6 km || 
|-id=744 bgcolor=#fefefe
| 168744 ||  || — || August 28, 2000 || Socorro || LINEAR || FLO || align=right | 1.0 km || 
|-id=745 bgcolor=#fefefe
| 168745 ||  || — || August 28, 2000 || Socorro || LINEAR || — || align=right | 1.4 km || 
|-id=746 bgcolor=#fefefe
| 168746 ||  || — || August 25, 2000 || Socorro || LINEAR || FLO || align=right | 1.4 km || 
|-id=747 bgcolor=#fefefe
| 168747 ||  || — || August 25, 2000 || Socorro || LINEAR || V || align=right | 1.3 km || 
|-id=748 bgcolor=#fefefe
| 168748 ||  || — || August 25, 2000 || Socorro || LINEAR || FLO || align=right | 1.7 km || 
|-id=749 bgcolor=#d6d6d6
| 168749 ||  || — || August 31, 2000 || Socorro || LINEAR || — || align=right | 8.2 km || 
|-id=750 bgcolor=#d6d6d6
| 168750 ||  || — || August 31, 2000 || Socorro || LINEAR || EOS || align=right | 3.6 km || 
|-id=751 bgcolor=#fefefe
| 168751 ||  || — || August 31, 2000 || Socorro || LINEAR || — || align=right | 1.3 km || 
|-id=752 bgcolor=#d6d6d6
| 168752 ||  || — || August 31, 2000 || Socorro || LINEAR || — || align=right | 5.8 km || 
|-id=753 bgcolor=#fefefe
| 168753 ||  || — || August 26, 2000 || Socorro || LINEAR || — || align=right | 1.2 km || 
|-id=754 bgcolor=#fefefe
| 168754 ||  || — || August 26, 2000 || Socorro || LINEAR || — || align=right | 1.4 km || 
|-id=755 bgcolor=#fefefe
| 168755 ||  || — || August 26, 2000 || Socorro || LINEAR || — || align=right | 1.2 km || 
|-id=756 bgcolor=#fefefe
| 168756 ||  || — || August 29, 2000 || Socorro || LINEAR || FLO || align=right | 1.0 km || 
|-id=757 bgcolor=#fefefe
| 168757 ||  || — || August 29, 2000 || Socorro || LINEAR || — || align=right | 1.4 km || 
|-id=758 bgcolor=#fefefe
| 168758 ||  || — || August 29, 2000 || Socorro || LINEAR || — || align=right | 1.2 km || 
|-id=759 bgcolor=#fefefe
| 168759 ||  || — || August 31, 2000 || Socorro || LINEAR || — || align=right | 1.2 km || 
|-id=760 bgcolor=#fefefe
| 168760 ||  || — || August 31, 2000 || Socorro || LINEAR || V || align=right | 2.0 km || 
|-id=761 bgcolor=#fefefe
| 168761 ||  || — || August 31, 2000 || Socorro || LINEAR || — || align=right | 1.6 km || 
|-id=762 bgcolor=#fefefe
| 168762 ||  || — || August 31, 2000 || Socorro || LINEAR || FLO || align=right data-sort-value="0.98" | 980 m || 
|-id=763 bgcolor=#fefefe
| 168763 ||  || — || August 31, 2000 || Socorro || LINEAR || — || align=right | 1.2 km || 
|-id=764 bgcolor=#fefefe
| 168764 ||  || — || August 21, 2000 || Anderson Mesa || LONEOS || — || align=right | 1.4 km || 
|-id=765 bgcolor=#fefefe
| 168765 ||  || — || August 21, 2000 || Anderson Mesa || LONEOS || — || align=right | 2.8 km || 
|-id=766 bgcolor=#fefefe
| 168766 ||  || — || August 26, 2000 || Socorro || LINEAR || — || align=right | 1.4 km || 
|-id=767 bgcolor=#fefefe
| 168767 Kochte ||  ||  || August 25, 2000 || Cerro Tololo || M. W. Buie || — || align=right | 1.2 km || 
|-id=768 bgcolor=#fefefe
| 168768 ||  || — || September 1, 2000 || Socorro || LINEAR || — || align=right | 1.4 km || 
|-id=769 bgcolor=#fefefe
| 168769 ||  || — || September 1, 2000 || Socorro || LINEAR || — || align=right | 1.2 km || 
|-id=770 bgcolor=#fefefe
| 168770 ||  || — || September 1, 2000 || Socorro || LINEAR || — || align=right | 1.4 km || 
|-id=771 bgcolor=#fefefe
| 168771 ||  || — || September 1, 2000 || Socorro || LINEAR || V || align=right | 1.1 km || 
|-id=772 bgcolor=#fefefe
| 168772 ||  || — || September 1, 2000 || Socorro || LINEAR || — || align=right | 1.4 km || 
|-id=773 bgcolor=#fefefe
| 168773 ||  || — || September 1, 2000 || Socorro || LINEAR || — || align=right | 1.3 km || 
|-id=774 bgcolor=#fefefe
| 168774 ||  || — || September 1, 2000 || Socorro || LINEAR || V || align=right | 1.0 km || 
|-id=775 bgcolor=#fefefe
| 168775 ||  || — || September 1, 2000 || Socorro || LINEAR || FLO || align=right | 1.00 km || 
|-id=776 bgcolor=#fefefe
| 168776 ||  || — || September 1, 2000 || Socorro || LINEAR || — || align=right | 1.3 km || 
|-id=777 bgcolor=#fefefe
| 168777 ||  || — || September 3, 2000 || Socorro || LINEAR || — || align=right | 2.0 km || 
|-id=778 bgcolor=#fefefe
| 168778 ||  || — || September 3, 2000 || Socorro || LINEAR || — || align=right | 1.9 km || 
|-id=779 bgcolor=#fefefe
| 168779 ||  || — || September 3, 2000 || Socorro || LINEAR || — || align=right | 2.1 km || 
|-id=780 bgcolor=#fefefe
| 168780 ||  || — || September 4, 2000 || Kitt Peak || Spacewatch || — || align=right | 1.3 km || 
|-id=781 bgcolor=#fefefe
| 168781 ||  || — || September 7, 2000 || Kitt Peak || Spacewatch || FLO || align=right | 1.0 km || 
|-id=782 bgcolor=#fefefe
| 168782 ||  || — || September 3, 2000 || Socorro || LINEAR || — || align=right | 1.5 km || 
|-id=783 bgcolor=#fefefe
| 168783 ||  || — || September 6, 2000 || Socorro || LINEAR || V || align=right | 1.1 km || 
|-id=784 bgcolor=#fefefe
| 168784 ||  || — || September 20, 2000 || Socorro || LINEAR || — || align=right | 1.8 km || 
|-id=785 bgcolor=#fefefe
| 168785 ||  || — || September 22, 2000 || Kitt Peak || Spacewatch || FLO || align=right | 1.2 km || 
|-id=786 bgcolor=#fefefe
| 168786 ||  || — || September 24, 2000 || Socorro || LINEAR || — || align=right | 3.3 km || 
|-id=787 bgcolor=#fefefe
| 168787 ||  || — || September 19, 2000 || Haleakala || NEAT || — || align=right | 1.2 km || 
|-id=788 bgcolor=#fefefe
| 168788 ||  || — || September 23, 2000 || Socorro || LINEAR || — || align=right | 1.2 km || 
|-id=789 bgcolor=#fefefe
| 168789 ||  || — || September 24, 2000 || Socorro || LINEAR || — || align=right | 1.0 km || 
|-id=790 bgcolor=#fefefe
| 168790 ||  || — || September 24, 2000 || Socorro || LINEAR || — || align=right | 1.3 km || 
|-id=791 bgcolor=#FFC2E0
| 168791 ||  || — || September 25, 2000 || Haleakala || NEAT || AMO || align=right data-sort-value="0.69" | 690 m || 
|-id=792 bgcolor=#fefefe
| 168792 ||  || — || September 24, 2000 || Socorro || LINEAR || FLO || align=right data-sort-value="0.86" | 860 m || 
|-id=793 bgcolor=#d6d6d6
| 168793 ||  || — || September 24, 2000 || Socorro || LINEAR || 7:4 || align=right | 6.6 km || 
|-id=794 bgcolor=#d6d6d6
| 168794 ||  || — || September 24, 2000 || Socorro || LINEAR || — || align=right | 5.4 km || 
|-id=795 bgcolor=#fefefe
| 168795 ||  || — || September 24, 2000 || Socorro || LINEAR || NYS || align=right data-sort-value="0.98" | 980 m || 
|-id=796 bgcolor=#fefefe
| 168796 ||  || — || September 24, 2000 || Socorro || LINEAR || V || align=right | 1.1 km || 
|-id=797 bgcolor=#fefefe
| 168797 ||  || — || September 24, 2000 || Socorro || LINEAR || FLO || align=right data-sort-value="0.91" | 910 m || 
|-id=798 bgcolor=#fefefe
| 168798 ||  || — || September 24, 2000 || Socorro || LINEAR || V || align=right data-sort-value="0.79" | 790 m || 
|-id=799 bgcolor=#d6d6d6
| 168799 ||  || — || September 23, 2000 || Socorro || LINEAR || — || align=right | 5.3 km || 
|-id=800 bgcolor=#fefefe
| 168800 ||  || — || September 23, 2000 || Socorro || LINEAR || — || align=right | 1.2 km || 
|}

168801–168900 

|-bgcolor=#fefefe
| 168801 ||  || — || September 24, 2000 || Socorro || LINEAR || NYS || align=right data-sort-value="0.96" | 960 m || 
|-id=802 bgcolor=#fefefe
| 168802 ||  || — || September 24, 2000 || Socorro || LINEAR || — || align=right | 1.8 km || 
|-id=803 bgcolor=#fefefe
| 168803 ||  || — || September 24, 2000 || Socorro || LINEAR || V || align=right | 1.2 km || 
|-id=804 bgcolor=#fefefe
| 168804 ||  || — || September 23, 2000 || Socorro || LINEAR || — || align=right | 1.5 km || 
|-id=805 bgcolor=#fefefe
| 168805 ||  || — || September 23, 2000 || Socorro || LINEAR || — || align=right | 1.9 km || 
|-id=806 bgcolor=#fefefe
| 168806 ||  || — || September 23, 2000 || Socorro || LINEAR || V || align=right | 1.2 km || 
|-id=807 bgcolor=#fefefe
| 168807 ||  || — || September 24, 2000 || Socorro || LINEAR || — || align=right | 1.4 km || 
|-id=808 bgcolor=#fefefe
| 168808 ||  || — || September 24, 2000 || Socorro || LINEAR || — || align=right | 1.2 km || 
|-id=809 bgcolor=#fefefe
| 168809 ||  || — || September 23, 2000 || Socorro || LINEAR || — || align=right | 1.2 km || 
|-id=810 bgcolor=#d6d6d6
| 168810 ||  || — || September 28, 2000 || Socorro || LINEAR || EOS || align=right | 4.2 km || 
|-id=811 bgcolor=#fefefe
| 168811 ||  || — || September 20, 2000 || Kitt Peak || Spacewatch || V || align=right | 1.2 km || 
|-id=812 bgcolor=#fefefe
| 168812 ||  || — || September 22, 2000 || Kitt Peak || Spacewatch || — || align=right | 1.4 km || 
|-id=813 bgcolor=#fefefe
| 168813 ||  || — || September 22, 2000 || Kitt Peak || Spacewatch || NYS || align=right data-sort-value="0.99" | 990 m || 
|-id=814 bgcolor=#fefefe
| 168814 ||  || — || September 26, 2000 || Socorro || LINEAR || V || align=right | 1.5 km || 
|-id=815 bgcolor=#fefefe
| 168815 ||  || — || September 26, 2000 || Socorro || LINEAR || FLO || align=right | 1.6 km || 
|-id=816 bgcolor=#fefefe
| 168816 ||  || — || September 27, 2000 || Socorro || LINEAR || FLO || align=right | 1.3 km || 
|-id=817 bgcolor=#fefefe
| 168817 ||  || — || September 24, 2000 || Socorro || LINEAR || — || align=right | 1.4 km || 
|-id=818 bgcolor=#fefefe
| 168818 ||  || — || September 25, 2000 || Socorro || LINEAR || FLO || align=right | 1.2 km || 
|-id=819 bgcolor=#fefefe
| 168819 ||  || — || September 26, 2000 || Socorro || LINEAR || — || align=right | 1.5 km || 
|-id=820 bgcolor=#fefefe
| 168820 ||  || — || September 26, 2000 || Socorro || LINEAR || FLO || align=right | 1.1 km || 
|-id=821 bgcolor=#fefefe
| 168821 ||  || — || September 27, 2000 || Socorro || LINEAR || FLO || align=right data-sort-value="0.89" | 890 m || 
|-id=822 bgcolor=#fefefe
| 168822 ||  || — || September 27, 2000 || Socorro || LINEAR || NYS || align=right data-sort-value="0.94" | 940 m || 
|-id=823 bgcolor=#fefefe
| 168823 ||  || — || September 27, 2000 || Socorro || LINEAR || — || align=right | 1.6 km || 
|-id=824 bgcolor=#fefefe
| 168824 ||  || — || September 28, 2000 || Socorro || LINEAR || — || align=right | 1.2 km || 
|-id=825 bgcolor=#fefefe
| 168825 ||  || — || September 27, 2000 || Socorro || LINEAR || FLO || align=right | 1.0 km || 
|-id=826 bgcolor=#fefefe
| 168826 ||  || — || September 27, 2000 || Socorro || LINEAR || — || align=right | 1.2 km || 
|-id=827 bgcolor=#fefefe
| 168827 ||  || — || September 30, 2000 || Socorro || LINEAR || V || align=right | 1.3 km || 
|-id=828 bgcolor=#FA8072
| 168828 ||  || — || September 29, 2000 || Mauna Kea || D. J. Tholen || PHO || align=right | 1.9 km || 
|-id=829 bgcolor=#fefefe
| 168829 ||  || — || September 28, 2000 || Kitt Peak || Spacewatch || — || align=right | 1.1 km || 
|-id=830 bgcolor=#fefefe
| 168830 ||  || — || September 26, 2000 || Haleakala || NEAT || V || align=right data-sort-value="0.94" | 940 m || 
|-id=831 bgcolor=#fefefe
| 168831 ||  || — || September 26, 2000 || Haleakala || NEAT || FLO || align=right | 1.3 km || 
|-id=832 bgcolor=#fefefe
| 168832 ||  || — || September 24, 2000 || Socorro || LINEAR || FLO || align=right | 1.5 km || 
|-id=833 bgcolor=#fefefe
| 168833 ||  || — || September 23, 2000 || Socorro || LINEAR || — || align=right | 1.4 km || 
|-id=834 bgcolor=#fefefe
| 168834 ||  || — || September 26, 2000 || Anderson Mesa || LONEOS || — || align=right | 1.5 km || 
|-id=835 bgcolor=#fefefe
| 168835 ||  || — || September 20, 2000 || Socorro || LINEAR || — || align=right data-sort-value="0.94" | 940 m || 
|-id=836 bgcolor=#d6d6d6
| 168836 ||  || — || September 20, 2000 || Socorro || LINEAR || — || align=right | 5.1 km || 
|-id=837 bgcolor=#d6d6d6
| 168837 ||  || — || October 1, 2000 || Socorro || LINEAR || 7:4 || align=right | 7.6 km || 
|-id=838 bgcolor=#fefefe
| 168838 ||  || — || October 1, 2000 || Socorro || LINEAR || FLO || align=right | 1.1 km || 
|-id=839 bgcolor=#fefefe
| 168839 ||  || — || October 1, 2000 || Anderson Mesa || LONEOS || FLO || align=right | 2.1 km || 
|-id=840 bgcolor=#fefefe
| 168840 ||  || — || October 2, 2000 || Socorro || LINEAR || FLO || align=right data-sort-value="0.85" | 850 m || 
|-id=841 bgcolor=#fefefe
| 168841 ||  || — || October 2, 2000 || Kitt Peak || Spacewatch || — || align=right | 1.1 km || 
|-id=842 bgcolor=#fefefe
| 168842 || 2000 UP || — || October 20, 2000 || Ondřejov || P. Kušnirák || — || align=right | 1.4 km || 
|-id=843 bgcolor=#fefefe
| 168843 ||  || — || October 24, 2000 || Socorro || LINEAR || V || align=right | 1.1 km || 
|-id=844 bgcolor=#fefefe
| 168844 ||  || — || October 24, 2000 || Socorro || LINEAR || NYS || align=right data-sort-value="0.99" | 990 m || 
|-id=845 bgcolor=#fefefe
| 168845 ||  || — || October 25, 2000 || Socorro || LINEAR || FLO || align=right | 1.1 km || 
|-id=846 bgcolor=#fefefe
| 168846 ||  || — || October 24, 2000 || Socorro || LINEAR || — || align=right | 1.0 km || 
|-id=847 bgcolor=#fefefe
| 168847 ||  || — || October 24, 2000 || Socorro || LINEAR || NYS || align=right | 1.1 km || 
|-id=848 bgcolor=#fefefe
| 168848 ||  || — || October 24, 2000 || Socorro || LINEAR || NYS || align=right | 1.3 km || 
|-id=849 bgcolor=#fefefe
| 168849 ||  || — || October 24, 2000 || Socorro || LINEAR || — || align=right | 1.2 km || 
|-id=850 bgcolor=#fefefe
| 168850 ||  || — || October 25, 2000 || Socorro || LINEAR || NYS || align=right | 1.0 km || 
|-id=851 bgcolor=#fefefe
| 168851 ||  || — || October 25, 2000 || Socorro || LINEAR || V || align=right | 1.2 km || 
|-id=852 bgcolor=#fefefe
| 168852 ||  || — || October 25, 2000 || Socorro || LINEAR || — || align=right | 1.4 km || 
|-id=853 bgcolor=#fefefe
| 168853 ||  || — || October 24, 2000 || Socorro || LINEAR || — || align=right | 1.3 km || 
|-id=854 bgcolor=#fefefe
| 168854 ||  || — || October 31, 2000 || Socorro || LINEAR || FLO || align=right | 1.3 km || 
|-id=855 bgcolor=#fefefe
| 168855 ||  || — || October 24, 2000 || Socorro || LINEAR || — || align=right | 1.4 km || 
|-id=856 bgcolor=#fefefe
| 168856 ||  || — || October 25, 2000 || Socorro || LINEAR || — || align=right | 2.8 km || 
|-id=857 bgcolor=#fefefe
| 168857 ||  || — || October 25, 2000 || Socorro || LINEAR || FLO || align=right data-sort-value="0.90" | 900 m || 
|-id=858 bgcolor=#fefefe
| 168858 ||  || — || November 1, 2000 || Socorro || LINEAR || NYS || align=right data-sort-value="0.93" | 930 m || 
|-id=859 bgcolor=#fefefe
| 168859 ||  || — || November 1, 2000 || Socorro || LINEAR || FLO || align=right | 2.0 km || 
|-id=860 bgcolor=#fefefe
| 168860 ||  || — || November 1, 2000 || Socorro || LINEAR || — || align=right | 1.4 km || 
|-id=861 bgcolor=#fefefe
| 168861 ||  || — || November 1, 2000 || Socorro || LINEAR || V || align=right | 1.0 km || 
|-id=862 bgcolor=#fefefe
| 168862 ||  || — || November 1, 2000 || Socorro || LINEAR || NYS || align=right | 1.1 km || 
|-id=863 bgcolor=#fefefe
| 168863 ||  || — || November 1, 2000 || Socorro || LINEAR || NYS || align=right | 1.0 km || 
|-id=864 bgcolor=#fefefe
| 168864 ||  || — || November 1, 2000 || Socorro || LINEAR || V || align=right | 1.0 km || 
|-id=865 bgcolor=#fefefe
| 168865 ||  || — || November 1, 2000 || Socorro || LINEAR || FLO || align=right data-sort-value="0.86" | 860 m || 
|-id=866 bgcolor=#fefefe
| 168866 ||  || — || November 1, 2000 || Socorro || LINEAR || — || align=right | 1.2 km || 
|-id=867 bgcolor=#fefefe
| 168867 ||  || — || November 2, 2000 || Socorro || LINEAR || — || align=right | 2.6 km || 
|-id=868 bgcolor=#fefefe
| 168868 ||  || — || November 3, 2000 || Socorro || LINEAR || V || align=right | 1.2 km || 
|-id=869 bgcolor=#fefefe
| 168869 ||  || — || November 19, 2000 || Socorro || LINEAR || V || align=right | 1.1 km || 
|-id=870 bgcolor=#FA8072
| 168870 ||  || — || November 20, 2000 || Socorro || LINEAR || — || align=right | 1.5 km || 
|-id=871 bgcolor=#fefefe
| 168871 ||  || — || November 18, 2000 || Bisei SG Center || BATTeRS || — || align=right | 1.7 km || 
|-id=872 bgcolor=#fefefe
| 168872 ||  || — || November 22, 2000 || Kitt Peak || Spacewatch || — || align=right | 1.3 km || 
|-id=873 bgcolor=#fefefe
| 168873 ||  || — || November 20, 2000 || Socorro || LINEAR || — || align=right | 1.3 km || 
|-id=874 bgcolor=#fefefe
| 168874 ||  || — || November 20, 2000 || Socorro || LINEAR || — || align=right | 1.4 km || 
|-id=875 bgcolor=#fefefe
| 168875 ||  || — || November 20, 2000 || Socorro || LINEAR || — || align=right | 1.6 km || 
|-id=876 bgcolor=#fefefe
| 168876 ||  || — || November 20, 2000 || Socorro || LINEAR || — || align=right | 2.7 km || 
|-id=877 bgcolor=#fefefe
| 168877 ||  || — || November 26, 2000 || Desert Beaver || W. K. Y. Yeung || — || align=right | 1.3 km || 
|-id=878 bgcolor=#fefefe
| 168878 ||  || — || November 26, 2000 || Bohyunsan || Y.-B. Jeon, B.-C. Lee || — || align=right data-sort-value="0.98" | 980 m || 
|-id=879 bgcolor=#fefefe
| 168879 ||  || — || November 20, 2000 || Socorro || LINEAR || — || align=right | 1.6 km || 
|-id=880 bgcolor=#fefefe
| 168880 ||  || — || November 21, 2000 || Socorro || LINEAR || — || align=right | 1.2 km || 
|-id=881 bgcolor=#FA8072
| 168881 ||  || — || November 21, 2000 || Socorro || LINEAR || — || align=right | 1.3 km || 
|-id=882 bgcolor=#fefefe
| 168882 ||  || — || November 21, 2000 || Socorro || LINEAR || — || align=right | 1.2 km || 
|-id=883 bgcolor=#fefefe
| 168883 ||  || — || November 21, 2000 || Socorro || LINEAR || — || align=right | 2.3 km || 
|-id=884 bgcolor=#fefefe
| 168884 ||  || — || November 19, 2000 || Socorro || LINEAR || — || align=right | 1.7 km || 
|-id=885 bgcolor=#fefefe
| 168885 ||  || — || November 20, 2000 || Socorro || LINEAR || — || align=right | 1.2 km || 
|-id=886 bgcolor=#fefefe
| 168886 ||  || — || November 20, 2000 || Socorro || LINEAR || — || align=right | 1.1 km || 
|-id=887 bgcolor=#fefefe
| 168887 ||  || — || November 20, 2000 || Socorro || LINEAR || V || align=right | 1.2 km || 
|-id=888 bgcolor=#fefefe
| 168888 ||  || — || November 21, 2000 || Socorro || LINEAR || — || align=right | 2.4 km || 
|-id=889 bgcolor=#FA8072
| 168889 ||  || — || November 21, 2000 || Socorro || LINEAR || — || align=right | 1.6 km || 
|-id=890 bgcolor=#fefefe
| 168890 ||  || — || November 20, 2000 || Socorro || LINEAR || — || align=right | 1.7 km || 
|-id=891 bgcolor=#fefefe
| 168891 ||  || — || November 29, 2000 || Socorro || LINEAR || V || align=right | 1.2 km || 
|-id=892 bgcolor=#fefefe
| 168892 ||  || — || November 19, 2000 || Socorro || LINEAR || PHO || align=right | 1.5 km || 
|-id=893 bgcolor=#fefefe
| 168893 ||  || — || November 18, 2000 || Kitt Peak || Spacewatch || NYS || align=right | 1.0 km || 
|-id=894 bgcolor=#fefefe
| 168894 ||  || — || November 19, 2000 || Kitt Peak || Spacewatch || FLO || align=right | 1.9 km || 
|-id=895 bgcolor=#fefefe
| 168895 ||  || — || November 20, 2000 || Anderson Mesa || LONEOS || — || align=right | 1.5 km || 
|-id=896 bgcolor=#fefefe
| 168896 ||  || — || November 19, 2000 || Socorro || LINEAR || — || align=right | 1.6 km || 
|-id=897 bgcolor=#fefefe
| 168897 ||  || — || November 20, 2000 || Socorro || LINEAR || — || align=right | 1.4 km || 
|-id=898 bgcolor=#fefefe
| 168898 ||  || — || November 20, 2000 || Socorro || LINEAR || — || align=right | 2.1 km || 
|-id=899 bgcolor=#fefefe
| 168899 ||  || — || November 28, 2000 || Kitt Peak || Spacewatch || FLO || align=right data-sort-value="0.98" | 980 m || 
|-id=900 bgcolor=#fefefe
| 168900 ||  || — || November 20, 2000 || Anderson Mesa || LONEOS || — || align=right | 2.6 km || 
|}

168901–169000 

|-bgcolor=#fefefe
| 168901 ||  || — || November 21, 2000 || Haleakala || NEAT || — || align=right | 1.6 km || 
|-id=902 bgcolor=#fefefe
| 168902 ||  || — || November 24, 2000 || Anderson Mesa || LONEOS || — || align=right | 1.1 km || 
|-id=903 bgcolor=#fefefe
| 168903 ||  || — || November 18, 2000 || Anderson Mesa || LONEOS || — || align=right | 1.2 km || 
|-id=904 bgcolor=#fefefe
| 168904 ||  || — || November 18, 2000 || Anderson Mesa || LONEOS || NYS || align=right data-sort-value="0.78" | 780 m || 
|-id=905 bgcolor=#fefefe
| 168905 ||  || — || December 3, 2000 || Kitt Peak || Spacewatch || — || align=right | 1.3 km || 
|-id=906 bgcolor=#fefefe
| 168906 ||  || — || December 4, 2000 || Socorro || LINEAR || FLO || align=right | 1.6 km || 
|-id=907 bgcolor=#fefefe
| 168907 ||  || — || December 4, 2000 || Socorro || LINEAR || V || align=right | 1.00 km || 
|-id=908 bgcolor=#fefefe
| 168908 ||  || — || December 4, 2000 || Socorro || LINEAR || V || align=right | 1.1 km || 
|-id=909 bgcolor=#fefefe
| 168909 ||  || — || December 4, 2000 || Socorro || LINEAR || V || align=right | 1.4 km || 
|-id=910 bgcolor=#fefefe
| 168910 ||  || — || December 6, 2000 || Socorro || LINEAR || — || align=right | 1.2 km || 
|-id=911 bgcolor=#fefefe
| 168911 ||  || — || December 14, 2000 || Bohyunsan || Y.-B. Jeon, B.-C. Lee || V || align=right | 1.1 km || 
|-id=912 bgcolor=#fefefe
| 168912 ||  || — || December 20, 2000 || Socorro || LINEAR || — || align=right | 2.0 km || 
|-id=913 bgcolor=#fefefe
| 168913 ||  || — || December 18, 2000 || Kitt Peak || Spacewatch || V || align=right | 1.0 km || 
|-id=914 bgcolor=#fefefe
| 168914 ||  || — || December 27, 2000 || Desert Beaver || W. K. Y. Yeung || — || align=right | 1.4 km || 
|-id=915 bgcolor=#fefefe
| 168915 ||  || — || December 30, 2000 || Socorro || LINEAR || — || align=right | 1.3 km || 
|-id=916 bgcolor=#fefefe
| 168916 ||  || — || December 30, 2000 || Socorro || LINEAR || — || align=right | 2.3 km || 
|-id=917 bgcolor=#fefefe
| 168917 ||  || — || December 30, 2000 || Socorro || LINEAR || NYS || align=right | 1.3 km || 
|-id=918 bgcolor=#fefefe
| 168918 ||  || — || December 30, 2000 || Socorro || LINEAR || NYS || align=right | 1.2 km || 
|-id=919 bgcolor=#fefefe
| 168919 ||  || — || December 30, 2000 || Socorro || LINEAR || NYS || align=right | 1.0 km || 
|-id=920 bgcolor=#fefefe
| 168920 ||  || — || December 30, 2000 || Socorro || LINEAR || — || align=right | 1.3 km || 
|-id=921 bgcolor=#fefefe
| 168921 ||  || — || December 30, 2000 || Socorro || LINEAR || — || align=right | 1.6 km || 
|-id=922 bgcolor=#fefefe
| 168922 ||  || — || December 30, 2000 || Socorro || LINEAR || — || align=right | 1.2 km || 
|-id=923 bgcolor=#fefefe
| 168923 ||  || — || December 30, 2000 || Socorro || LINEAR || — || align=right | 1.5 km || 
|-id=924 bgcolor=#fefefe
| 168924 ||  || — || December 30, 2000 || Socorro || LINEAR || — || align=right | 1.4 km || 
|-id=925 bgcolor=#fefefe
| 168925 ||  || — || December 30, 2000 || Socorro || LINEAR || V || align=right | 1.1 km || 
|-id=926 bgcolor=#fefefe
| 168926 ||  || — || December 16, 2000 || Kitt Peak || Spacewatch || — || align=right | 1.7 km || 
|-id=927 bgcolor=#fefefe
| 168927 ||  || — || December 28, 2000 || Socorro || LINEAR || — || align=right | 2.4 km || 
|-id=928 bgcolor=#fefefe
| 168928 ||  || — || December 30, 2000 || Socorro || LINEAR || V || align=right | 1.3 km || 
|-id=929 bgcolor=#fefefe
| 168929 ||  || — || December 30, 2000 || Socorro || LINEAR || — || align=right | 1.1 km || 
|-id=930 bgcolor=#fefefe
| 168930 ||  || — || December 30, 2000 || Socorro || LINEAR || FLO || align=right | 1.1 km || 
|-id=931 bgcolor=#fefefe
| 168931 ||  || — || December 30, 2000 || Socorro || LINEAR || — || align=right | 1.5 km || 
|-id=932 bgcolor=#fefefe
| 168932 ||  || — || December 30, 2000 || Socorro || LINEAR || NYS || align=right | 1.0 km || 
|-id=933 bgcolor=#fefefe
| 168933 ||  || — || December 30, 2000 || Socorro || LINEAR || FLO || align=right | 1.5 km || 
|-id=934 bgcolor=#fefefe
| 168934 ||  || — || December 30, 2000 || Socorro || LINEAR || NYS || align=right | 1.1 km || 
|-id=935 bgcolor=#fefefe
| 168935 ||  || — || December 30, 2000 || Socorro || LINEAR || NYS || align=right | 1.1 km || 
|-id=936 bgcolor=#fefefe
| 168936 ||  || — || December 30, 2000 || Socorro || LINEAR || CLA || align=right | 3.0 km || 
|-id=937 bgcolor=#fefefe
| 168937 ||  || — || December 30, 2000 || Socorro || LINEAR || V || align=right | 1.5 km || 
|-id=938 bgcolor=#fefefe
| 168938 ||  || — || December 30, 2000 || Socorro || LINEAR || NYS || align=right | 1.1 km || 
|-id=939 bgcolor=#fefefe
| 168939 ||  || — || December 30, 2000 || Socorro || LINEAR || NYS || align=right | 1.1 km || 
|-id=940 bgcolor=#fefefe
| 168940 ||  || — || December 30, 2000 || Socorro || LINEAR || NYS || align=right | 1.2 km || 
|-id=941 bgcolor=#fefefe
| 168941 ||  || — || December 30, 2000 || Socorro || LINEAR || V || align=right | 1.6 km || 
|-id=942 bgcolor=#fefefe
| 168942 ||  || — || December 30, 2000 || Socorro || LINEAR || — || align=right | 1.7 km || 
|-id=943 bgcolor=#fefefe
| 168943 ||  || — || December 30, 2000 || Socorro || LINEAR || — || align=right | 1.4 km || 
|-id=944 bgcolor=#E9E9E9
| 168944 ||  || — || December 29, 2000 || Anderson Mesa || LONEOS || — || align=right | 5.3 km || 
|-id=945 bgcolor=#fefefe
| 168945 ||  || — || December 30, 2000 || Desert Beaver || W. K. Y. Yeung || FLO || align=right | 1.1 km || 
|-id=946 bgcolor=#fefefe
| 168946 ||  || — || December 22, 2000 || Socorro || LINEAR || — || align=right | 1.2 km || 
|-id=947 bgcolor=#fefefe
| 168947 ||  || — || December 27, 2000 || Kitt Peak || Spacewatch || — || align=right | 2.6 km || 
|-id=948 bgcolor=#E9E9E9
| 168948 Silvestri ||  ||  || December 23, 2000 || Apache Point || SDSS || — || align=right | 2.5 km || 
|-id=949 bgcolor=#fefefe
| 168949 ||  || — || January 4, 2001 || Haleakala || NEAT || — || align=right data-sort-value="0.92" | 920 m || 
|-id=950 bgcolor=#fefefe
| 168950 ||  || — || January 2, 2001 || Socorro || LINEAR || — || align=right | 2.0 km || 
|-id=951 bgcolor=#fefefe
| 168951 ||  || — || January 4, 2001 || Socorro || LINEAR || — || align=right | 1.4 km || 
|-id=952 bgcolor=#fefefe
| 168952 ||  || — || January 2, 2001 || Kitt Peak || Spacewatch || NYS || align=right | 1.00 km || 
|-id=953 bgcolor=#fefefe
| 168953 ||  || — || January 14, 2001 || Kitt Peak || Spacewatch || — || align=right | 1.4 km || 
|-id=954 bgcolor=#fefefe
| 168954 ||  || — || January 15, 2001 || Oizumi || T. Kobayashi || — || align=right | 1.8 km || 
|-id=955 bgcolor=#fefefe
| 168955 ||  || — || January 15, 2001 || Oizumi || T. Kobayashi || ERI || align=right | 2.7 km || 
|-id=956 bgcolor=#FA8072
| 168956 ||  || — || January 15, 2001 || Socorro || LINEAR || PHO || align=right | 1.9 km || 
|-id=957 bgcolor=#fefefe
| 168957 ||  || — || January 5, 2001 || Socorro || LINEAR || FLO || align=right | 1.4 km || 
|-id=958 bgcolor=#fefefe
| 168958 ||  || — || January 5, 2001 || Socorro || LINEAR || — || align=right | 1.3 km || 
|-id=959 bgcolor=#fefefe
| 168959 ||  || — || January 19, 2001 || Socorro || LINEAR || — || align=right | 2.8 km || 
|-id=960 bgcolor=#E9E9E9
| 168960 ||  || — || January 19, 2001 || Socorro || LINEAR || — || align=right | 5.9 km || 
|-id=961 bgcolor=#fefefe
| 168961 ||  || — || January 20, 2001 || Socorro || LINEAR || — || align=right | 1.3 km || 
|-id=962 bgcolor=#fefefe
| 168962 ||  || — || January 20, 2001 || Socorro || LINEAR || NYS || align=right | 1.1 km || 
|-id=963 bgcolor=#fefefe
| 168963 ||  || — || January 20, 2001 || Socorro || LINEAR || NYS || align=right | 1.4 km || 
|-id=964 bgcolor=#fefefe
| 168964 ||  || — || January 19, 2001 || Socorro || LINEAR || MAS || align=right | 1.9 km || 
|-id=965 bgcolor=#fefefe
| 168965 ||  || — || January 21, 2001 || Socorro || LINEAR || NYS || align=right data-sort-value="0.88" | 880 m || 
|-id=966 bgcolor=#fefefe
| 168966 ||  || — || January 21, 2001 || Socorro || LINEAR || V || align=right | 1.2 km || 
|-id=967 bgcolor=#fefefe
| 168967 ||  || — || January 19, 2001 || Socorro || LINEAR || KLI || align=right | 4.0 km || 
|-id=968 bgcolor=#E9E9E9
| 168968 ||  || — || January 21, 2001 || Socorro || LINEAR || — || align=right | 3.5 km || 
|-id=969 bgcolor=#fefefe
| 168969 ||  || — || January 19, 2001 || Socorro || LINEAR || NYS || align=right | 1.1 km || 
|-id=970 bgcolor=#fefefe
| 168970 ||  || — || January 19, 2001 || Kitt Peak || Spacewatch || V || align=right | 1.1 km || 
|-id=971 bgcolor=#fefefe
| 168971 ||  || — || January 21, 2001 || Socorro || LINEAR || NYS || align=right | 1.1 km || 
|-id=972 bgcolor=#fefefe
| 168972 ||  || — || January 26, 2001 || Socorro || LINEAR || — || align=right | 2.4 km || 
|-id=973 bgcolor=#fefefe
| 168973 ||  || — || January 30, 2001 || Socorro || LINEAR || — || align=right | 1.4 km || 
|-id=974 bgcolor=#d6d6d6
| 168974 ||  || — || January 26, 2001 || Socorro || LINEAR || — || align=right | 5.7 km || 
|-id=975 bgcolor=#E9E9E9
| 168975 ||  || — || January 26, 2001 || Socorro || LINEAR || — || align=right | 2.0 km || 
|-id=976 bgcolor=#fefefe
| 168976 ||  || — || January 31, 2001 || Socorro || LINEAR || NYS || align=right | 1.5 km || 
|-id=977 bgcolor=#fefefe
| 168977 ||  || — || January 26, 2001 || Kitt Peak || Spacewatch || MAS || align=right | 1.1 km || 
|-id=978 bgcolor=#fefefe
| 168978 ||  || — || January 26, 2001 || Kitt Peak || Spacewatch || NYS || align=right | 1.2 km || 
|-id=979 bgcolor=#fefefe
| 168979 ||  || — || February 1, 2001 || Socorro || LINEAR || NYS || align=right | 1.3 km || 
|-id=980 bgcolor=#fefefe
| 168980 ||  || — || February 1, 2001 || Socorro || LINEAR || NYS || align=right | 1.1 km || 
|-id=981 bgcolor=#FA8072
| 168981 ||  || — || February 1, 2001 || Socorro || LINEAR || — || align=right | 2.2 km || 
|-id=982 bgcolor=#fefefe
| 168982 ||  || — || February 1, 2001 || Socorro || LINEAR || NYS || align=right | 1.1 km || 
|-id=983 bgcolor=#fefefe
| 168983 ||  || — || February 1, 2001 || Socorro || LINEAR || — || align=right | 1.2 km || 
|-id=984 bgcolor=#fefefe
| 168984 ||  || — || February 1, 2001 || Socorro || LINEAR || — || align=right | 1.0 km || 
|-id=985 bgcolor=#fefefe
| 168985 ||  || — || February 2, 2001 || Socorro || LINEAR || NYS || align=right | 1.0 km || 
|-id=986 bgcolor=#fefefe
| 168986 ||  || — || February 1, 2001 || Anderson Mesa || LONEOS || ERI || align=right | 2.2 km || 
|-id=987 bgcolor=#fefefe
| 168987 ||  || — || February 1, 2001 || Socorro || LINEAR || — || align=right | 2.4 km || 
|-id=988 bgcolor=#fefefe
| 168988 ||  || — || February 1, 2001 || Socorro || LINEAR || MAS || align=right | 1.4 km || 
|-id=989 bgcolor=#fefefe
| 168989 ||  || — || February 2, 2001 || Anderson Mesa || LONEOS || FLO || align=right | 1.6 km || 
|-id=990 bgcolor=#fefefe
| 168990 ||  || — || February 2, 2001 || Haleakala || NEAT || V || align=right | 1.4 km || 
|-id=991 bgcolor=#fefefe
| 168991 ||  || — || February 13, 2001 || Socorro || LINEAR || — || align=right | 3.5 km || 
|-id=992 bgcolor=#fefefe
| 168992 ||  || — || February 13, 2001 || Socorro || LINEAR || — || align=right | 1.6 km || 
|-id=993 bgcolor=#fefefe
| 168993 ||  || — || February 13, 2001 || Socorro || LINEAR || V || align=right | 1.3 km || 
|-id=994 bgcolor=#fefefe
| 168994 ||  || — || February 12, 2001 || Anderson Mesa || LONEOS || — || align=right | 1.7 km || 
|-id=995 bgcolor=#E9E9E9
| 168995 ||  || — || February 16, 2001 || Socorro || LINEAR || — || align=right | 2.5 km || 
|-id=996 bgcolor=#fefefe
| 168996 ||  || — || February 16, 2001 || Socorro || LINEAR || — || align=right | 2.0 km || 
|-id=997 bgcolor=#E9E9E9
| 168997 ||  || — || February 16, 2001 || Socorro || LINEAR || JUN || align=right | 1.8 km || 
|-id=998 bgcolor=#fefefe
| 168998 ||  || — || February 17, 2001 || Socorro || LINEAR || NYS || align=right | 1.0 km || 
|-id=999 bgcolor=#fefefe
| 168999 ||  || — || February 17, 2001 || Socorro || LINEAR || NYS || align=right | 1.2 km || 
|-id=000 bgcolor=#fefefe
| 169000 ||  || — || February 17, 2001 || Socorro || LINEAR || NYS || align=right | 2.6 km || 
|}

References

External links 
 Discovery Circumstances: Numbered Minor Planets (165001)–(170000) (IAU Minor Planet Center)

0168